= Small nucleolar RNA SNORD69 =

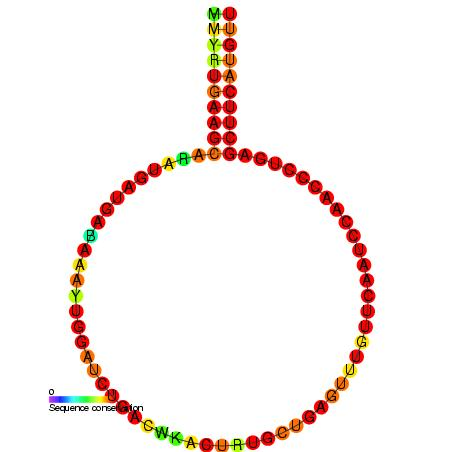
- Predicted secondary structure and sequence conservation of SNORD69

Identifiers
- Symbol: SNORD69
- Alt. Symbols: snoHBII-210
- Rfam: RF00574

Other data
- RNA type: Gene; snRNA; snoRNA; C/D-box
- Domain: Eukaryota
- GO: GO:0006396 GO:0005730
- SO: SO:0000593
- PDB structures: PDBe

In molecular biology, snoRNA HBII-210 belongs to the C/D family of snoRNAs. It is the human orthologue of the mouse MBII-210 and is predicted to guide the 2'O-ribose methylation of large 28S rRNA on residue G4464.
