= Small nucleolar RNA Z242 =

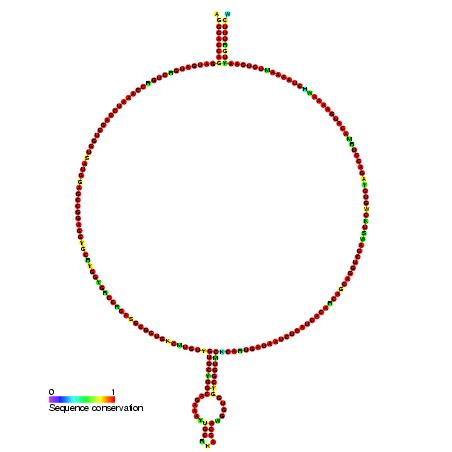
- Predicted secondary structure and sequence conservation of snoZ242

Identifiers
- Symbol: snoZ242
- Rfam: RF00441

Other data
- RNA type: Gene; snRNA; snoRNA; CD-box
- Domain: Eukaryota
- GO: GO:0006396 GO:0005730
- SO: SO:0001263
- PDB structures: PDBe

In molecular biology, Small nucleolar RNA Z242 is a non-coding RNA (ncRNA) molecule which function in the biogenesis of other small nuclear RNAs (snRNAs). This small nucleolar RNA (snoRNA) is a modifying RNA and usually located in the nucleolus of the eukaryotic cell which is a major site of snRNA biogenesis.

snoRNA Z242 was identified in rice Oryza sativa, and is predicted to belong to the C/D box class of snoRNAs which contain the conserved sequence motifs known as the C box (UGAUGA) and the D box (CUGA). Most of the members of the box C/D family function in directing site-specific 2'-O-methylation of substrate RNAs.
