= Small nucleolar RNA SNORD70 =

Human non-coding RNA

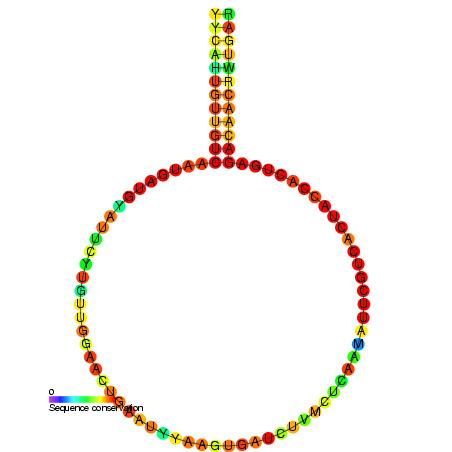
- Predicted secondary structure and sequence conservation of SNORD70

Identifiers
- Symbol: SNORD70
- Alt. Symbols: snoHBII-234
- Rfam: RF00575

Other data
- RNA type: Gene; snRNA; snoRNA; C/D-box
- Domain: Eukaryota
- GO: GO:0006396 GO:0005730
- SO: SO:0000593
- PDB structures: PDBe

In molecular biology, snoRNA SNORD70 (HBII-234) is a non-coding RNA that belongs to the C/D family of snoRNAs. It is the human orthologue of the mouse MBII-234 and is predicted to guide 2'O-ribose methylation of the small 18S rRNA on position A512. It is hosted, together with HBII-95, by the core C/D box snoRNA protein encoding gene NOP5/NOP58.
