= Small nucleolar RNA SNORD92 =

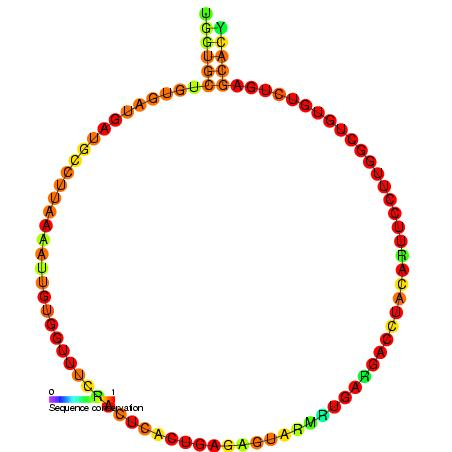

Identifiers
- Symbol: SNORD92
- Rfam: RF00605

Other data
- RNA type: Gene;snRNA;snoRNA;CD-box;
- PDB structures: PDBe

In molecular biology, Small Nucleolar RNA SNORD92 (also known as HBII-316) is a non-coding RNA (ncRNA) molecule which functions in the biogenesis (modification) of other small nuclear RNAs (snRNAs). This type of modifying RNA is located in the nucleolus of the eukaryotic cell which is a major site of snRNA biogenesis. It is known as a small nucleolar RNA (snoRNA) and also often referred to as a guide RNA.

SNORD92 belongs to the C/D box class of snoRNAs which contain the C (UGAUGA) and D (CUGA) box motifs. Most of the members of the C/D box family function in directing site-specific 2′-O-methylation of substrate RNAs. This snoRNA is the human orthologue of mouse snoRNA MBII-316. SNORD92 is predicted to guide the 2′O-ribose methylation of 28S ribosomal RNA (rRNA) residue A3846.
