= Small nucleolar RNA R44/J54/Z268 family =

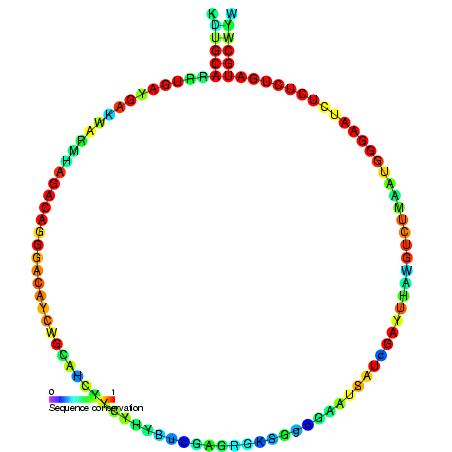
- Predicted secondary structure and sequence conservation of snoR44_J54

Identifiers
- Symbol: snoR44_J54
- Rfam: RF00357

Other data
- RNA type: Gene; snRNA; snoRNA; CD-box
- Domain: Eukaryota
- GO: GO:0006396 GO:0005730
- SO: SO:0000593
- PDB structures: PDBe

In molecular biology, Small nucleolar RNA R44/J54/Z268 refers to a group of related non-coding RNA (ncRNA) molecules which function in the biogenesis of other small nuclear RNAs (snRNAs). These small nucleolar RNAs (snoRNAs) are modifying RNAs and are usually located in the nucleolus of the eukaryotic cell which is a major site of snRNA biogenesis.

These snoRNAs appear plant-specific and were identified in Arabidopsis thaliana and rice Oryza sativa (snoRNAs Z268 and J54). These related snoRNAs are predicted to belong to the C/D box class of snoRNAs which contain the conserved sequence motifs known as the C box (UGAUGA) and the D box (CUGA). Most of the members of the box C/D family function in directing site-specific 2'-O-methylation of substrate RNAs.
