= Small nucleolar RNA Me28S-Cm788 =

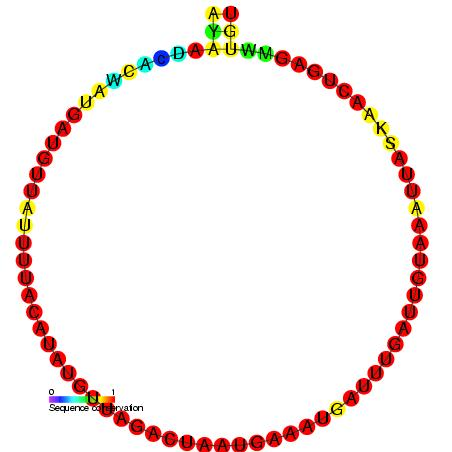
- Predicted secondary structure and sequence conservation of snoMe28S-Cm788

Identifiers
- Symbol: snoMe28S-Cm788
- Rfam: RF00539

Other data
- RNA type: Gene; snRNA; snoRNA; CD-box
- Domain: Eukaryota
- GO: GO:0006396 GO:0005730
- SO: SO:0000593
- PDB structures: PDBe

In molecular biology, Small nucleolar RNA Me28S-Cm788 is a non-coding RNA (ncRNA) molecule which functions in the modification of other small nuclear RNAs (snRNAs). This type of modifying RNA is usually located in the nucleolus of the eukaryotic cell, which is a major site of snRNA biogenesis. It is known as a small nucleolar RNA (snoRNA) and is also often referred to as a guide RNA. snoRNA Me28S-Cm788 belongs to the C/D box class of snoRNAs, which contain the conserved sequence motifs known as the C box (UGAUGA) and the D box (CUGA). Most of the members of the box C/D family function in directing site-specific 2'-O-methylation of substrate RNAs. This family is predicted to direct the 2'-O-methylation of 28S C-788.
