= Small nucleolar RNA Me18S-Gm1358 =

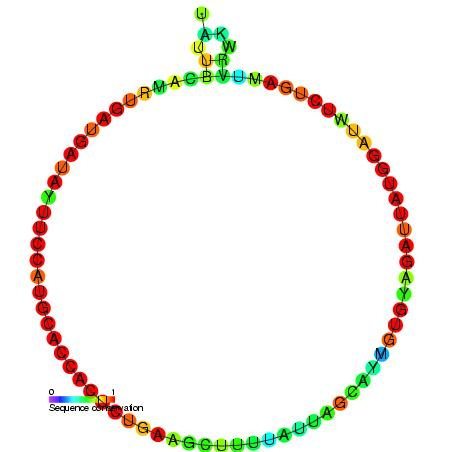
- Predicted secondary structure and sequence conservation of snoMe18S-Gm1358

Identifiers
- Symbol: snoMe18S-Gm1358
- Rfam: RF00533

Other data
- RNA type: Gene; snRNA; snoRNA; CD-box
- Domain: Eukaryota
- GO: GO:0006396 GO:0005730
- SO: SO:0000593
- PDB structures: PDBe

In molecular biology, the Small nucleolar RNA Me18S-Gm1358 is a non-coding RNA (ncRNA) molecule which functions in the modification of other small nuclear RNAs (snRNAs). This type of modifying RNA is usually located in the nucleolus of the eukaryotic cell which is a major site of snRNA biogenesis. It is known as a small nucleolar RNA (snoRNA) and also often referred to as a guide RNA. snoRNA Me18S-Gm1358 belongs to the C/D box class of snoRNAs which contain the conserved sequence motifs known as the C box (UGAUGA) and the D box (CUGA). Most of the members of the box C/D family function in directing site-specific 2'-O-methylation of substrate RNAs. It is predicted that this family directs 2'-O-methylation of 18S G-1358.
