= Small nucleolar RNA Me28S-Am2634 =

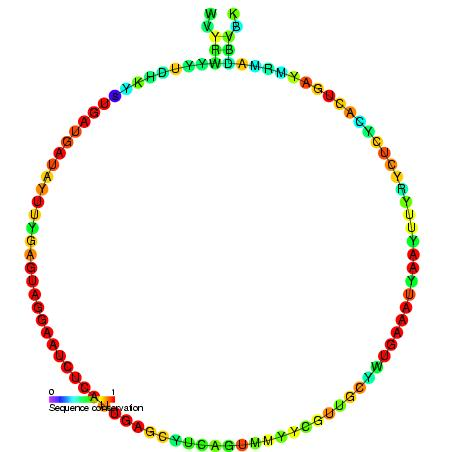
- Predicted secondary structure and sequence conservation of snoMe28S-Am2634

Identifiers
- Symbol: snoMe28S-Am2634
- Rfam: RF00537

Other data
- RNA type: Gene; snRNA; snoRNA; CD-box
- Domain: Eukaryota
- GO: GO:0006396 GO:0005730
- SO: SO:0000593
- PDB structures: PDBe

In molecular biology, Small nucleolar RNA Me28S-Am2634 (also known as snoRNA Me28S-Am2634) is a non-coding RNA (ncRNA) molecule which functions in the biogenesis of other small nuclear RNAs (snRNAs). Small nucleolar RNAs (snoRNAs) are modifying RNAs and usually located in the nucleolus of the eukaryotic cell which is a major site of snRNA biogenesis.

snoRNA Me28S-Am2634 belongs to the C/D box class of snoRNAs which contain the conserved sequence motifs known as the C box (UGAUGA) and the D box (CUGA). Most of the members of the box C/D family function in directing site-specific 2'-O-methylation of substrate RNAs. It is predicted to guide the 2'-O-methylation of 28S ribosomal RNA (rRNA) residue A-2634.

This snoRNA has currently only been identified in the fly species Drosophila melanogaster.
