= Small nucleolar RNA snR54 =

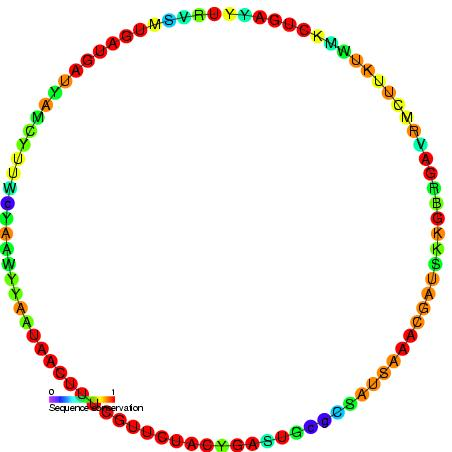
- Predicted secondary structure and sequence conservation of snosnR54

Identifiers
- Symbol: snosnR54
- Rfam: RF00473

Other data
- RNA type: Gene; snRNA; snoRNA; CD-box
- Domain: Eukaryota
- GO: GO:0006396 GO:0005730
- SO: SO:0000593
- PDB structures: PDBe

In molecular biology, snR54 is a non-coding RNA that is a member of the C/D class of snoRNA which contain the C box motif (UGAUGA) and D box motif (CUGA). Most of the members of the box C/D family function in directing site-specific 2'-O-methylation of substrate RNAs. This snoRNA was first identified by a computational screen followed by experimental verification. This RNA guides the 2'-O-methylation of 18S rRNA. In yeast this snoRNA is found to reside in an intron of the IMD4 gene.

== Species distribution ==
This snoRNA has been identified in both yeasts and Drosophila melanogaster.
