= Small nucleolar RNA snoR639/H1 =

Non-coding RNA molecule

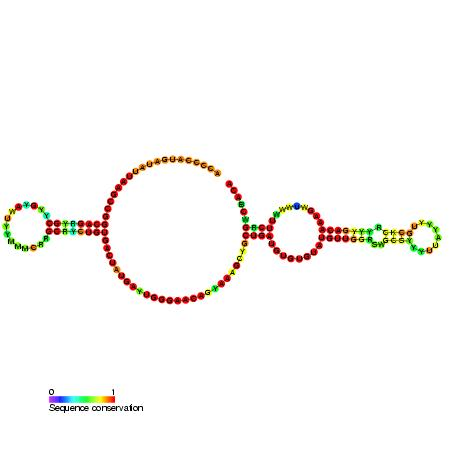
- Predicted secondary structure and sequence conservation of snoR639

Identifiers
- Symbol: snoR639
- Rfam: RF00291

Other data
- RNA type: Gene; snRNA; snoRNA; HACA-box
- Domain: Eukaryota
- GO: GO:0006396 GO:0005730
- SO: SO:0001263
- PDB structures: PDBe

In molecular biology, Small nucleolar RNA snoR639 (also known as snoH1) is a non-coding RNA (ncRNA) molecule which functions in the biogenesis (modification) of other small nuclear RNAs (snRNAs). This type of modifying RNA is located in the nucleolus of the eukaryotic cell which is a major site of snRNA biogenesis. It is known as a small nucleolar RNA (snoRNA) and also often referred to as a 'guide RNA'.

snoR639 was originally identified in a study of Drosophila melanogaster minifly (mfl) gene; snoR639 resides in the intron of this gene. It was later rediscovered by a large-scale RNomics effort. snoR639 belongs to the H/ACA box class of snoRNAs as it has the predicted hairpin-hinge-hairpin-tail structure, has the conserved H/ACA-box motifs and is found associated with GAR1 protein.
