= Small nucleolar RNA SNORD98 =

Non-coding RNA molecule, which functions in the biogenesis of other small nuclear RNAs

Small Nucleolar RNA SNORD98
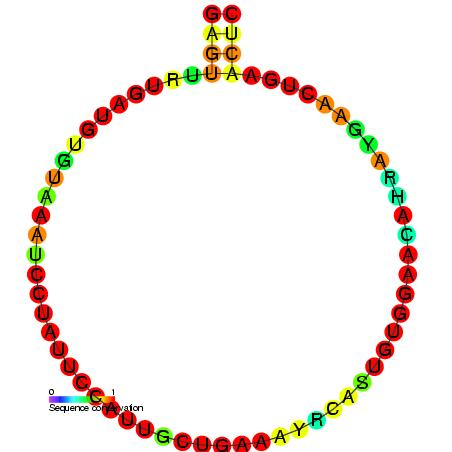
- Predicted secondary structure and sequence conservation of SNORD98

Identifiers
- Symbol: SNORD98
- Rfam: RF00607

Other data
- RNA type: Gene; snRNA; snoRNA; C/D-box
- Domain: Eukaryota
- GO: GO:0006396 GO:0005730
- SO: SO:0000593
- PDB structures: PDBe

In molecular biology, Small Nucleolar RNA SNORD98 (also known as HBII-419) is a non-coding RNA (ncRNA) molecule which functions in the biogenesis (modification) of other small nuclear RNAs (snRNAs). This type of modifying RNA is located in the nucleolus of the eukaryotic cell which is a major site of snRNA biogenesis. It is known as a small nucleolar RNA (snoRNA) and also often referred to as a guide RNA.

SNORD98 belongs to the C/D box class of snoRNAs which contain the C (UGAUGA) and D (CUGA) box motifs. Most of the members of the box C/D family function in directing site-specific 2′-O-methylation of substrate RNAs. SNORD98 is predicted to guide the 2'0-ribose methylation of 18S ribosomal RNA (rRNA) residue G867.
