= Small nucleolar RNA SNORD88 =

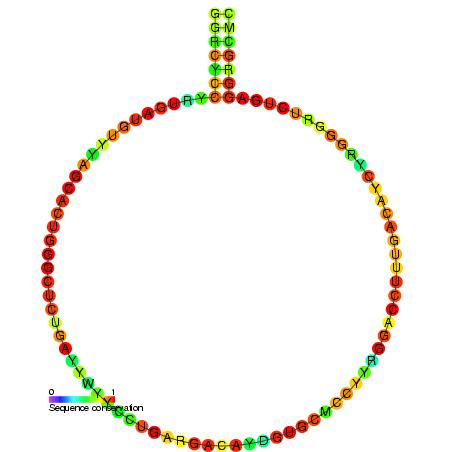
- Predicted secondary structure and sequence conservation of SNORD88

Identifiers
- Symbol: SNORD88
- Rfam: RF00604

Other data
- RNA type: Gene; snRNA; snoRNA; C/D-box
- Domain: Eukaryota
- GO: GO:0006396 GO:0005730
- SO: SO:0000593
- PDB structures: PDBe

In molecular biology, Small Nucleolar RNA SNORD88 (also known as HBII-180) is a non-coding RNA (ncRNA) molecule which functions in the biogenesis (modification) of other small nuclear RNAs (snRNAs). This type of modifying RNA is located in the nucleolus of the eukaryotic cell which is a major site of snRNA biogenesis. It is known as a small nucleolar RNA (snoRNA) and also often referred to as a guide RNA.

SNORD88 belongs to the C/D box class of snoRNAs which contain the C (UGAUGA) and D (CUGA) box motifs. Most of the members of the C/D box family function in directing site-specific 2′-O-methylation of substrate RNAs. This snoRNA is the human orthologue of mouse snoRNA MBII-180. SNORD88 is also related to mouse snoRNA MBII-211. SNORD88 is predicted to guide the 2′O-ribose methylation of 28S ribosomal RNA (rRNA) residue C3680.

There is evidence that SNORD88 is processed into smaller fragments in a similar fashion to a microRNA and can suppress protein expression.
