= Small nucleolar RNA SNORD65 =

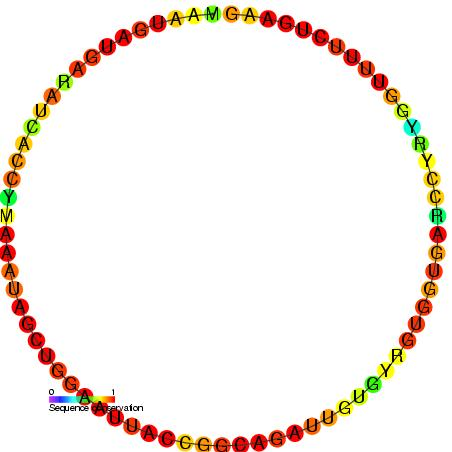
- Predicted secondary structure and sequence conservation of SNORD65

Identifiers
- Symbol: SNORD65
- Alt. Symbols: snoHBII-135
- Rfam: RF00571

Other data
- RNA type: Gene; snRNA; snoRNA; C/D-box
- Domain: Eukaryota
- GO: GO:0006396 GO:0005730
- SO: SO:0000593
- PDB structures: PDBe

In molecular biology, SNORD65 (also known as HBII-135) is a non-coding RNA (ncRNA) molecule which functions in the biogenesis (modification) of other small nuclear RNAs (snRNAs). This type of modifying RNA is located in the nucleolus of the eukaryotic cell which is a major site of snRNA biogenesis. It is known as a small nucleolar RNA (snoRNA) and also often referred to as a guide RNA. SNORD19 belongs to the C/D box class of snoRNAs which contain the conserved sequence motifs known as the C box (UGAUGA) and the D box (CUGA). Most of the members of the box C/D family function in directing site-specific 2'-O-methylation of substrate RNAs.

SNORD65 is the human orthologue of the mouse MBII-135 snoRNA and is predicted to guide 2'O-ribose methylation of the small subunit (SSU) ribosomal RNA (rRNA), 18S, on position U627.
