= Small nucleolar RNA R105/R108 =

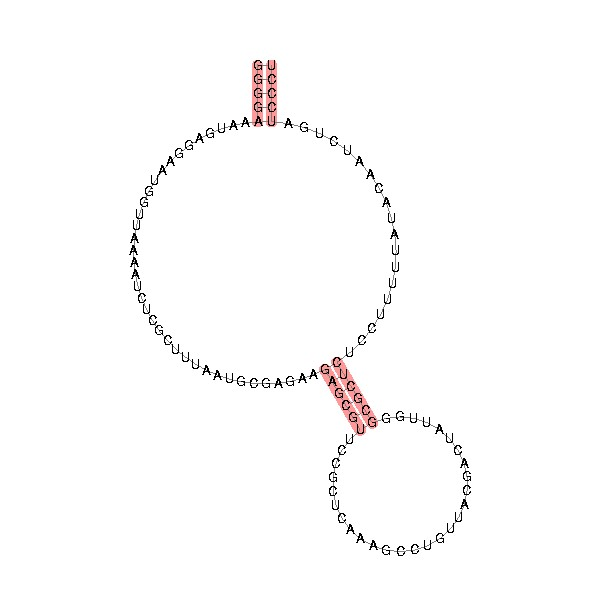

Identifiers
- Symbol: snoR105_108
- Rfam: RF00450

Other data
- RNA type: Gene; snRNA; guide; CD-box;
- PDB structures: PDBe

In molecular biology, Small nucleolar RNA R105/R108 refers to a group of related non-coding RNA (ncRNA) molecules which function in the biogenesis of other small nuclear RNAs (snRNAs). These small nucleolar RNAs (snoRNAs) are modifying RNAs and usually located in the nucleolus of the eukaryotic cell which is a major site of snRNA biogenesis.

These two snoRNAs called R105 and R108 were identified in the plant Arabidopsis thaliana and are predicted to belong to the C/D box class of snoRNAs which contain the conserved sequence motifs known as the C box (UGAUGA) and the D box (CUGA). Most of the members of the box C/D family function in directing site-specific 2'-O-methylation of substrate RNAs.
