= Small nucleolar RNA snoZ7/snoR77 =

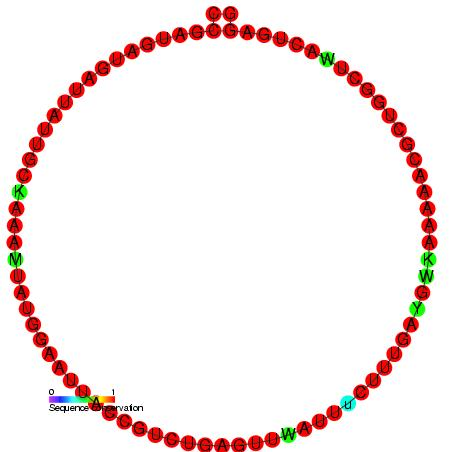
- Predicted secondary structure and sequence conservation of snoZ7

Identifiers
- Symbol: snoZ7
- Alt. Symbols: snoR77
- Rfam: RF00268

Other data
- RNA type: Gene; snRNA; snoRNA; CD-box
- Domain: Eukaryota
- GO: GO:0006396 GO:0005730
- SO: SO:0000593
- PDB structures: PDBe

In molecular biology, the snoRNA snoZ7/snoZ77 family contains related non-coding RNA molecules that are members of the C/D class of snoRNA which contain the C box motif (UGAUGA) and the D box motif (CUGA). Most of the members of the box C/D family function in directing site-specific 2'-O-methylation of substrate RNAs. snoZ7 RNA guides the methylation of 25S rRNA position A1372, whereas SnoR77Y guides the methylation of 18S rRNA at position U580. This family of snoRNAs has been found in plant species such as Arabidopsis thaliana.
