= Small nucleolar RNA SNORD111 =

Small Nucleolar RNA SNORD111
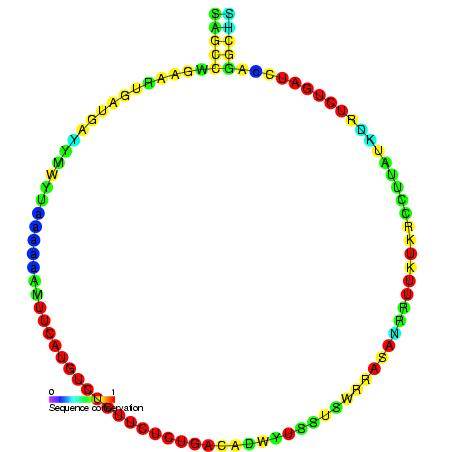
- Predicted secondary structure and sequence conservation of SNORD111

Identifiers
- Symbol: SNORD111
- Rfam: RF00611

Other data
- RNA type: Gene; snRNA; snoRNA; C/D-box
- Domain: Eukaryota
- GO: GO:0006396 GO:0005730
- SO: SO:0000593
- PDB structures: PDBe

In molecular biology, Small Nucleolar RNA SNORD111 (also known as HBII-82) is a non-coding RNA (ncRNA) molecule which functions in the biogenesis (modification) of other small nuclear RNAs (snRNAs). This type of modifying RNA is located in the nucleolus of the eukaryotic cell which is a major site of snRNA biogenesis. It is known as a small nucleolar RNA (snoRNA) and also often referred to as a guide RNA.

SNORD111 belongs to the C/D box class of snoRNAs which contain the C (UGAUGA) and D (CUGA) box motifs. Most of the members of the box C/D family function in directing site-specific 2′-O-methylation of substrate RNAs.

SNORD111 is predicted to guide the 2′O-ribose methylation of 28S ribosomal RNA (rRNA) at residue G3923.

The exact role of these molecules, however, is not currently known.
