= Small nucleolar RNA U83B =

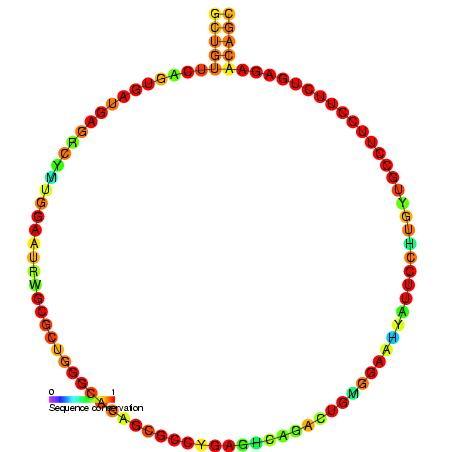
- Predicted secondary structure and sequence conservation of snoU83B

Identifiers
- Symbol: snoU83B
- Rfam: RF00593

Other data
- RNA type: Gene; snRNA; snoRNA; CD-box
- Domain: Eukaryota
- GO: GO:0006396 GO:0005730
- SO: SO:0000593
- PDB structures: PDBe

In molecular biology, U83B belongs to the C/D family of snoRNAs. U83B like U83A has no documented RNA target and they share the same host gene with the C/D box snoRNA U43 (RPL3). N.B. U83A/B/C have no sequence similarity with the U83 snoRNA that was cloned by Jady and Kiss (2000).
