= Small nucleolar RNA 296A/B =

Small nucleolar RNA SNORD91 family
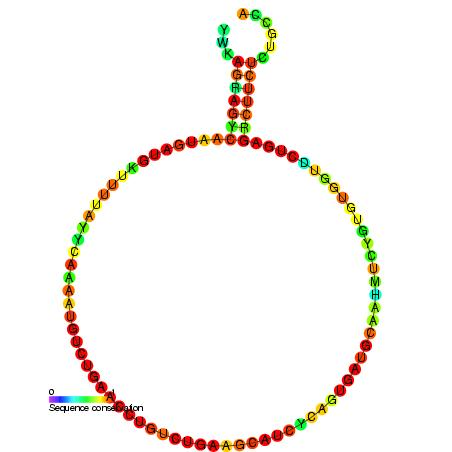
- Predicted secondary structure and sequence conservation of SNORD91

Identifiers
- Symbol: SNORD91
- Alt. Symbols: snoHBII-296A
- Rfam: RF00580

Other data
- RNA type: Gene; snRNA; snoRNA; C/D-box
- Domain: Eukaryota
- GO: GO:0006396 GO:0005730
- SO: SO:0000593
- PDB structures: PDBe

In molecular biology, snoRNAs HBII-296A and B belong to the C/D family of snoRNAs. They are close paralogues sharing the same host gene (FLJ10534) and are predicted to guide 2'O-ribose methylation of the large 28S rRNA at position G4588.
