= Small nucleolar RNA Z248 =

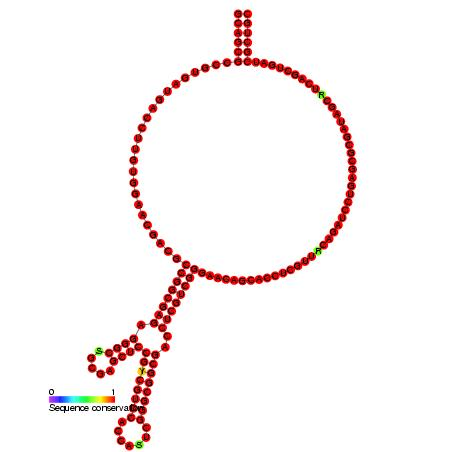
- Predicted secondary structure and sequence conservation of snoZ248

Identifiers
- Symbol: snoZ248
- Rfam: RF00305

Other data
- RNA type: Gene; snRNA; snoRNA; CD-box
- Domain: Eukaryota
- GO: GO:0006396 GO:0005730
- SO: SO:0000593
- PDB structures: PDBe

In molecular biology, Z248 is a member of the C/D class of snoRNA which contain the C (UGAUGA) and D (CUGA) box motifs. Most of the members of the box C/D family function in directing site-specific 2'-O-methylation of substrate RNAs.
