= Small nucleolar RNA R160 =

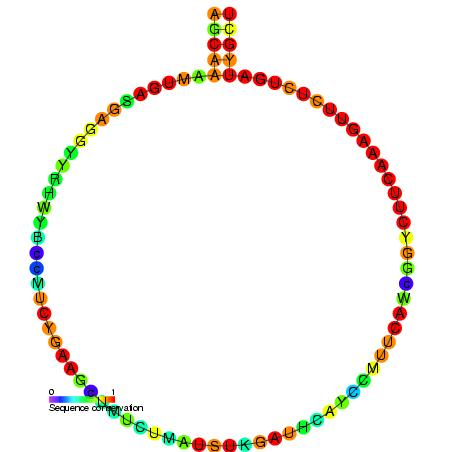
- Predicted secondary structure and sequence conservation of snoR160

Identifiers
- Symbol: snoR160
- Rfam: RF00203

Other data
- RNA type: Gene; snRNA; snoRNA; CD-box
- Domain: Eukaryota
- GO: GO:0006396 GO:0005730
- SO: SO:0000593
- PDB structures: PDBe

In molecular biology, Small nucleolar RNA R160 (also known as snoR160) is a non-coding RNA (ncRNA) molecule identified in plants which functions in the modification of other small nuclear RNAs (snRNAs). This type of modifying RNA is usually located in the nucleolus of the eukaryotic cell which is a major site of snRNA biogenesis. It is known as a small nucleolar RNA (snoRNA) and also often referred to as a guide RNA.

snoR160 belongs to the C/D box class of snoRNAs which contain the conserved sequence motifs known as the C box (UGAUGA) and the D box (CUGA). Most of the members of the box C/D family function in directing site-specific 2'-O-methylation of substrate RNAs.

snoR160 was identified by computational screening of the rice Oryza sativa and is predicted to acts as a methylation guide for 25S ribosomal RNA in plants. snoR160 has also been alternatively named snoZ270 in rice.
