= Small nucleolar RNA snR48 =

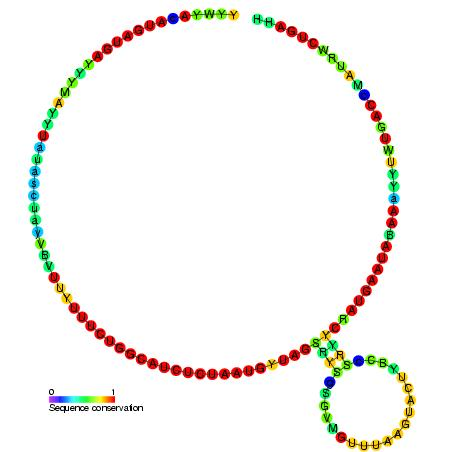
- Predicted secondary structure and sequence conservation of snosnR48

Identifiers
- Symbol: snosnR48
- Rfam: RF00471

Other data
- RNA type: Gene; snRNA; snoRNA; CD-box
- Domain: Eukaryota
- GO: GO:0005730 GO:0006396
- SO: SO:0000593
- PDB structures: PDBe

In molecular biology, the snoRNA snR48 is a non-coding RNA (ncRNA) molecule which functions in the modification of other small nuclear RNAs (snRNAs). This type of modifying RNA is usually located in the nucleolus of the eukaryotic cell which is a major site of snRNA biogenesis. It is known as a small nucleolar RNA (snoRNA) and also often referred to as a guide RNA.

snR48 belongs to the C/D box class of snoRNAs which contain the conserved sequence motifs known as the C box (UGAUGA) and the D box (CUGA). Most of the members of the box C/D family function in directing site-specific 2'-O-methylation of substrate RNAs.

snR48 was identified in yeast (Saccharomyces cerevisiae) by computational screening of the yeast genome. This snoRNA is predicted to guide the 2'O ribose methylation of 28S ribosomal RNA (rRNA) residues Gm2788 and Gm2790.
