= Small nucleolar RNA SNORD89 =

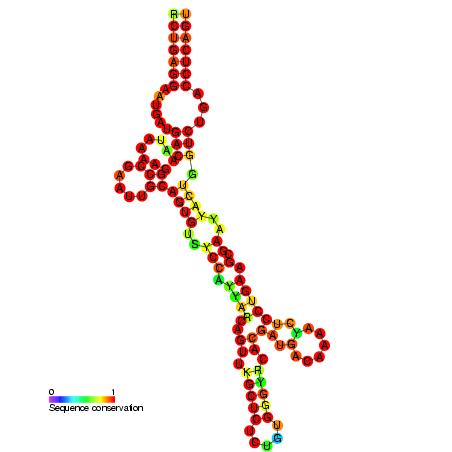
- Predicted secondary structure and sequence conservation of SNORD89

Identifiers
- Symbol: SNORD89
- Alt. Symbols: snoHBII-289
- Rfam: RF00578

Other data
- RNA type: Gene; snRNA; snoRNA; C/D-box
- Domain: Eukaryota
- GO: GO:0006396 GO:0005730
- SO: SO:0000593
- PDB structures: PDBe

In molecular biology, snoRNA HBII-289 belongs to the family of C/D snoRNAs. It is the human orthologue of the mouse MBII-289 and has no identified RNA target.
