= Small nucleolar RNA SNORD93 =

Small Nucleolar RNA SNORD93
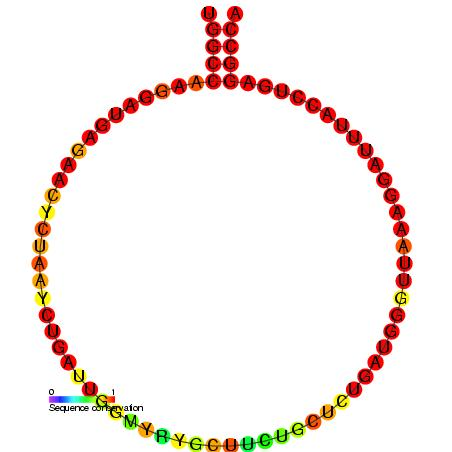
- Predicted secondary structure and sequence conservation of SNORD93

Identifiers
- Symbol: SNORD93
- Rfam: RF00606

Other data
- RNA type: Gene; snRNA; snoRNA; C/D-box
- Domain: Eukaryota
- GO: GO:0006396 GO:0005730
- SO: SO:0000593
- PDB structures: PDBe

In molecular biology, Small Nucleolar RNA SNORD93 (also known as HBII-336) is a non-coding RNA (ncRNA) molecule that functions in the biogenesis (modification) of other small nuclear RNAs (snRNAs). This type of modifying RNA is located in the nucleolus of the Eukaryotic cell, which is a major site of snRNA biogenesis. It is known as a small nucleolar RNA (snoRNA) and is also often referred to as a guide RNA.

SNORD93 belongs to the C/D box class of snoRNAs, which contain the C (UGAUGA) and D (CUGA) box motifs. Most members of the box C/D family function in directing site-specific 2'-O-methylation of substrate RNAs. This snoRNA is the human orthologue of mouse snoRNA MBII-336. SNORD93 is predicted to guide the 2'O-ribose methylation of 18S ribosomal RNA (rRNA) residue A576. Additionally, SNORD93 can be processed into a smaller, microRNA-like fragment (termed snoRNA-derived RNA(sdRNA)) that contributes to the malignant phenotype of breast cancer. The processed piece (sdRNA-93) has been shown to target Pipox, a sarcosine metabolism-related protein whose expression significantly correlates with distinct molecular subtypes of breast cancer.
