= Small nucleolar RNA SNORA75 =

RNA type

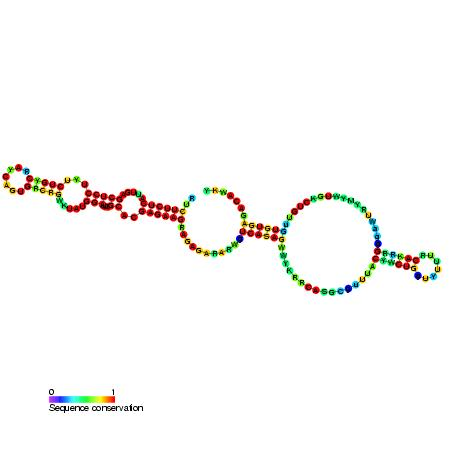
- Predicted secondary structure and sequence conservation of SNORA75

Identifiers
- Symbol: SNORA75
- Alt. Symbols: U23
- Rfam: RF00072

Other data
- RNA type: Gene; snRNA; snoRNA; H/ACA-box
- Domain: Eukaryota
- GO: GO:0006396 GO:0005730
- SO: SO:0000594
- PDB structures: PDBe

In molecular biology, U23 belongs to the H/ACA class of snoRNAs. snoRNAs bind a number of proteins (including dyskerin, Gar1p and Nop10p in the case of the H/ACA class) to form snoRNP complexes. This class are thought to guide the sites of modification of uridines to pseudouridines by forming direct base pairing interactions with substrate RNAs. Targets include ribosomal and spliceosomal RNAs as well as the Trypanosoma spliced leader RNA (SL RNA) as possibly other, still unknown cellular RNAs. U23 can direct the pseudouridylation of U97 in human 18S rRNA. U23 is encoded within intron 12 of the nucleolin gene in human, mouse, rat chicken, and Xenopus laevis.
