= Small nucleolar RNA snoM1 =

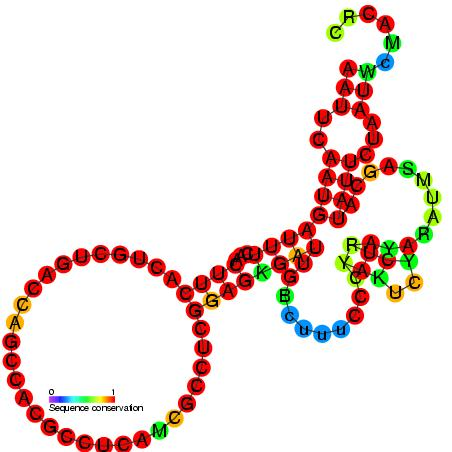
- Predicted secondary structure and sequence conservation of snoM1

Identifiers
- Symbol: snoM1
- Rfam: RF00293

Other data
- RNA type: Gene; snRNA; snoRNA; HACA-box
- Domain: Eukaryota
- GO: GO:0006396 GO:0005730
- SO: SO:0000594
- PDB structures: PDBe

In molecular biology, Small nucleolar RNA snoM1 is a non-coding RNA (ncRNA) molecule which functions in the biogenesis (modification) of other small nuclear RNAs (snRNAs). This type of modifying RNA is located in the nucleolus of the eukaryotic cell which is a major site of snRNA biogenesis. It is known as a small nucleolar RNA (snoRNA) and also often referred to as a 'guide RNA'.

M1 is a predicted to belong to the H/ACA box class of snoRNAs which are thought to guide the sites of modification of uridines to pseudouridines. snoM1 seems to be found exclusively in Drosophila species.
