= Small nucleolar RNA SNORD23 =

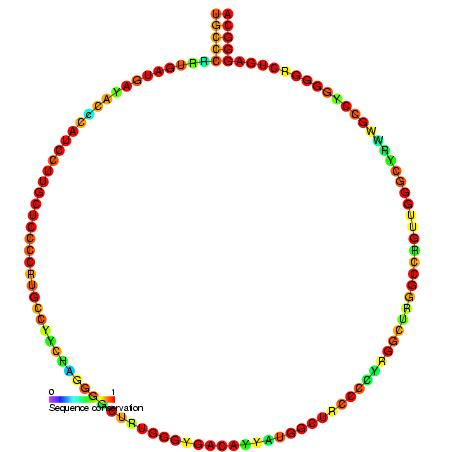
- Predicted secondary structure and sequence conservation of SNORD23

Identifiers
- Symbol: SNORD23
- Rfam: RF00603

Other data
- RNA type: Gene; snRNA; snoRNA; C/D-box
- Domain: Eukaryota
- GO: GO:0006396 GO:0005730
- SO: SO:0000593
- PDB structures: PDBe

In molecular biology, Small Nucleolar RNA SNORD23 (also known as HBII-115) is a non-coding RNA (ncRNA) molecule which functions in the biogenesis (modification) of other small nuclear RNAs (snRNAs). This type of modifying RNA is located in the nucleolus of the eukaryotic cell which is a major site of snRNA biogenesis. It is known as a small nucleolar RNA (snoRNA) and also often referred to as a guide RNA.

SNORD23 belongs to the C/D box class of snoRNAs which contain the C (UGAUGA) and D (CUGA) box motifs. Most of the members of the C/D box family function in directing site-specific 2′-O-methylation of substrate RNAs. This snoRNA is the human orthologue of mouse snoRNA MBII-115. There is currently no predicted target RNA for SNORD23.
