= Small nucleolar RNA Z199 =

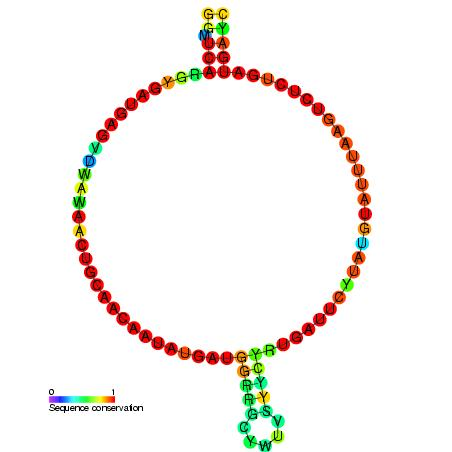
- Predicted secondary structure and sequence conservation of snoZ199

Identifiers
- Symbol: snoZ199
- Rfam: RF00200

Other data
- RNA type: Gene; snRNA; snoRNA; CD-box
- Domain: Eukaryota
- GO: GO:0006396 GO:0005730
- SO: SO:0000593
- PDB structures: PDBe

In molecular biology, snoRNA Z199 is a non-coding RNA (ncRNA) molecule which functions in the biogenesis (modification) of other small nuclear RNAs (snRNAs). This type of modifying RNA is located in the nucleolus of the eukaryotic cell which is a major site of snRNA biogenesis. It is known as a small nucleolar RNA (snoRNA) and also often referred to as a guide RNA.

snoRNA Z199 is a member of the C/D box class of snoRNAs which contain the conserved sequence motifs known as the C box (UGAUGA) and the D box (CUGA). Most of the members of the box C/D family function in directing site-specific 2'-O-methylation of substrate RNAs.

snoZ199 is predicted to be a methylation guide for sites on 18S and 25S ribosomal RNA (rRNA). Oryza sativa snoZ199 is reported to be homologous to Arabidopsis thaliana snoR13.
