= Small nucleolar RNA SNORD72 =

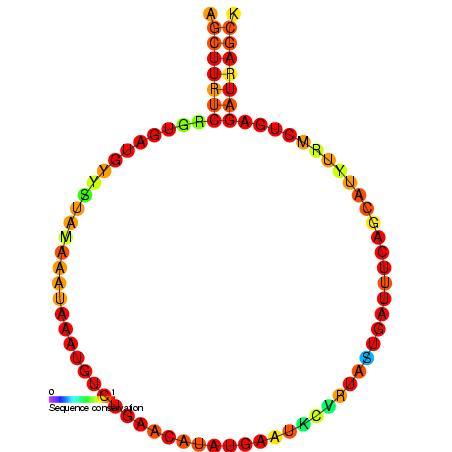
- Predicted secondary structure and sequence conservation of SNORD72

Identifiers
- Symbol: SNORD72
- Alt. Symbols: snoHBII-240
- Rfam: RF00577

Other data
- RNA type: Gene; snRNA; snoRNA; C/D-box
- Domain: Eukaryota
- GO: GO:0006396 GO:0005730
- SO: SO:0000593
- PDB structures: PDBe

In molecular biology, SNORD72 (also known as HBII-240) belongs to the C/D family of snoRNAs. It is the human orthologue of the mouse MBII-240 and is predicted to guide 2'O-ribose methylation of the large 28S rRNA at residue U4590.
