= Small nucleolar RNA Z107/R87 =

Group of related non-coding RNA molecules

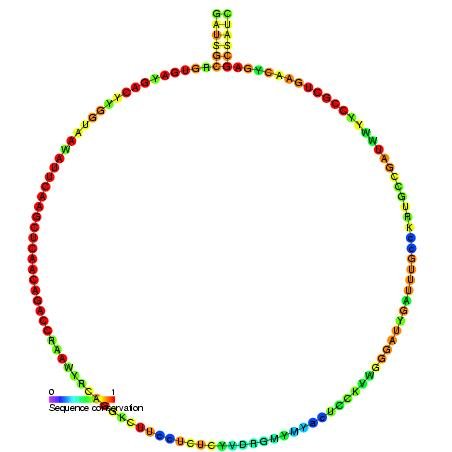
- Predicted secondary structure and sequence conservation of snoZ107_R87

Identifiers
- Symbol: snoZ107_R87
- Rfam: RF00360

Other data
- RNA type: Gene; snRNA; snoRNA; CD-box
- Domain: Eukaryota
- GO: GO:0006396 GO:0005730
- SO: SO:0000593
- PDB structures: PDBe

In molecular biology, Small nucleolar RNA RZ107/R87 refers to a group of related non-coding RNA (ncRNA) molecules which function in the biogenesis of other small nuclear RNAs (snRNAs). These small nucleolar RNAs (snoRNAs) are modifying RNAs and usually located in the nucleolus of the eukaryotic cell which is a major site of snRNA biogenesis.

These two snoRNAs R87 and Z107 were identified in the plant Arabidopsis thaliana and rice Oryza sativa respectively. These related snoRNAs are predicted to belong to the C/D box class of snoRNAs which contain the conserved sequence motifs known as the C box (UGAUGA) and the D box (CUGA). Most of the members of the box C/D family function in directing site-specific 2'-O-methylation of substrate RNAs.
