= Small nuclear RNA =

Class of RNA molecules

Small nuclear RNA (snRNA) is a class of small RNA molecules that are found within the splicing speckles and Cajal bodies of the cell nucleus in eukaryotic cells. The length of an average snRNA is approximately 150 nucleotides. They are transcribed by either RNA polymerase II or RNA polymerase III. Their primary function is in the processing of pre-messenger RNA (hnRNA) in the nucleus. They have also been shown to aid in the regulation of transcription factors (7SK RNA) or RNA polymerase II (B2 RNA), and in the maintenance of telomeres.

snRNA are always associated with a set of specific proteins, and the complexes are referred to as small nuclear ribonucleoproteins (snRNP, often pronounced "snurps"). Each snRNP particle is composed of an snRNA component and several snRNP-specific proteins (including Sm proteins, a family of nuclear proteins). The most common human snRNA components of these complexes are known, respectively, as: U1 spliceosomal RNA, U2 spliceosomal RNA, U4 spliceosomal RNA, U5 spliceosomal RNA, and U6 spliceosomal RNA. Their nomenclature derives from their high uridine content.

snRNAs were discovered by accident during a gel electrophoresis experiment in 1966. An unexpected type of RNA was found in the gel and investigated. Later analysis has shown that these RNA were high in uridylate and were established in the nucleus.

snRNAs and small nucleolar RNAs (snoRNAs) are not the same and neither is a subtype of the other. Each is a separate class of small RNAs. Small nucleolar RNAs play essential roles in RNA biogenesis and guide chemical modifications of ribosomal RNAs (rRNAs) and other RNA genes including tRNAs and snRNAs. They are located in the nucleolus and the Cajal bodies of eukaryotic cells (the major sites of RNA synthesis), where they are called scaRNAs (small Cajal body-specific RNAs).

== Classes ==
snRNA are often divided into two classes based upon both common sequence features as well as associated protein factors such as the RNA-binding LSm proteins.

The first class, known as Sm-class snRNA, is more widely studied and consists of U1, U2, U4, U4atac, U5, U7, U11, and U12. Sm-class snRNA are transcribed by RNA polymerase II. The pre-snRNA are transcribed and receive the usual 7-methylguanosine five-prime cap in the nucleus. They are then exported to the cytoplasm through nuclear pores for further processing. In the cytoplasm, the snRNA receive 3′ trimming to form a 3′ stem-loop structure, as well as hypermethylation of the 5′ cap to form trimethylguanosine. The 3′ stem structure is necessary for recognition by the survival of motor neuron (SMN) protein. This complex assembles the snRNA into stable ribonucleoproteins (RNPs). The modified 5′ cap is then required to import the snRNP back into the nucleus. All of these uridine-rich snRNA, with the exception of U7, form the core of the spliceosome. Splicing, or the removal of introns, is a major aspect of post-transcriptional modification, and takes place only in the nucleus of eukaryotes. U7 snRNA has been found to function in histone pre-mRNA processing.

The second class, known as Lsm-class snRNA, consists of U6 and U6atac. Lsm-class snRNAs are transcribed by RNA polymerase III and never leave the nucleus, in contrast to Sm-class snRNA. Lsm-class snRNAs contain a 5′-γ-monomethylphosphate cap and a 3′ stem–loop, terminating in a stretch of uridines that form the binding site for a distinct heteroheptameric ring of Lsm proteins.

== In the spliceosome ==
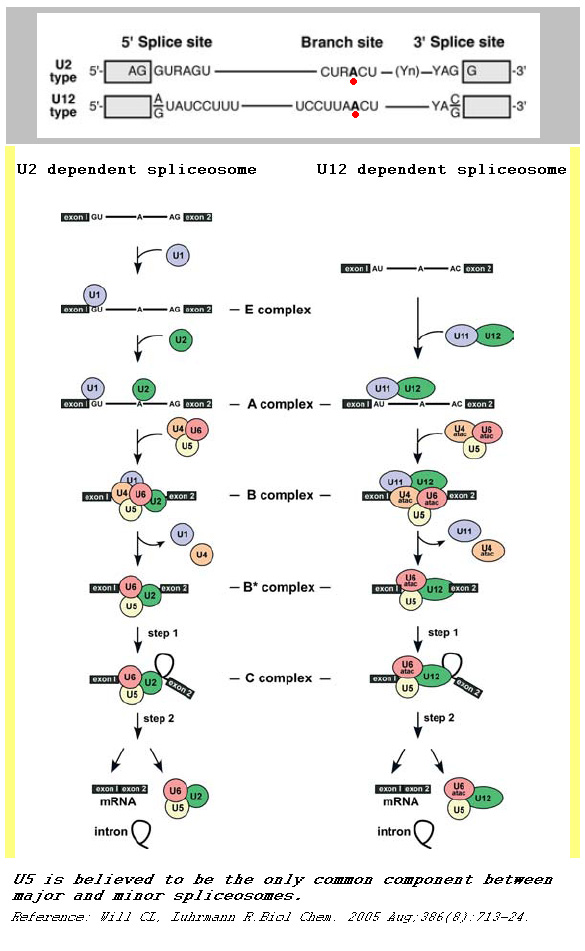
A comparison between major and minor splicing mechanisms

Spliceosomes catalyse splicing, an integral step in eukaryotic precursor messenger RNA maturation. A splicing mistake in even a single nucleotide can be devastating to the cell, and a reliable, repeatable method of RNA processing is necessary to ensure cell survival. The spliceosome is a large, protein-RNA complex that consists of five small nuclear RNAs (U1, U2, U4, U5, and U6) and over 150 proteins. The snRNAs, along with their associated proteins, form ribonucleoprotein complexes (snRNPs), which bind to specific sequences on the pre-mRNA substrate. This intricate process results in two sequential transesterification reactions. These reactions will produce a free lariat intron and ligate two exons to form a mature mRNA. There are two separate classes of spliceosomes. The major class, which is far more abundant in eukaryotic cells, splices primarily U2-type introns. The initial step of splicing is the bonding of the U1 snRNP and its associated proteins to the 5' splice end to the hnRNA. This creates the commitment complex which will constrain the hnRNA to the splicing pathway. Then, U2 snRNP is recruited to the spliceosome binding site and forms complex A, after which the U5.U4/U6 tri-snRNP complex binds to complex A to form the structure known as complex B. After rearrangement, complex C is formed, and the spliceosome is active for catalysis. In the catalytically active spliceosome U2 and U6 snRNAs fold to form a conserved structure called the catalytic triplex. This structure coordinates two magnesium ions that form the active site of the spliceosome. This is an example of RNA catalysis.

In addition to this main spliceosome complex, there exists a much less common (~1%) minor spliceosome. This complex comprises U11, U12, U4atac, U6atac and U5 snRNPs. These snRNPs are functional analogs of the snRNPs used in the major spliceosome. The minor spliceosome splices U12-type introns. The two types of introns mainly differ in their splicing sites: U2-type introns have GT-AG 5′ and 3′ splice sites while U12-type introns have AT-AC at their 5′ and 3′ ends. The minor spliceosome carries out its function through a different pathway from the major spliceosome.

== U1 snRNA ==
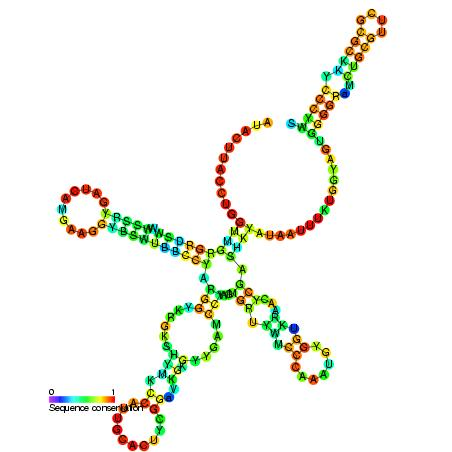
Predicted secondary structure and sequence conservation of U1 snRNA

U1 snRNP is the initiator of spliceosomal activity in the cell by base pairing with the 5′ splice site of the pre-mRNA. In the major spliceosome, experimental data has shown that the U1 snRNP is present in equal stoichiometry with U2, U4, U5, and U6 snRNP. However, U1 snRNP's abundance in human cells is far greater than that of the other snRNPs. Through U1 snRNA gene knockdown in HeLa cells, studies have shown the U1 snRNA holds great importance for cellular function. When U1 snRNA genes were knocked out, genomic microarrays showed an increased accumulation of unspliced pre-mRNA. In addition, the knockout was shown to cause premature cleavage and polyadenylation primarily in introns located near the beginning of the transcript. When other uridine based snRNAs were knocked out, this effect was not seen. Thus, U1 snRNA–pre-mRNA base pairing was shown to protect pre-mRNA from polyadenylation as well as premature cleavage. This special protection may explain the overabundance of U1 snRNA in the cell.

== snRNPs and human disease ==
The study of small nuclear ribonucleoproteins (snRNPs) and small nucleolar (sno)RNPs has increased the understanding of many diseases.

Spinal muscular atrophy - Mutations in the survival motor neuron-1 (SMN1) gene result in the degeneration of spinal motor neurons and severe muscle wasting. The SMN protein assembles Sm-class snRNPs, and probably also snoRNPs and other RNPs. Spinal muscular atrophy affects up to 1 in 6,000 people and is the second leading cause of neuromuscular disease, after Duchenne muscular dystrophy.

Dyskeratosis congenita – Mutations in the assembled snRNPs are also found to be a cause of dyskeratosis congenita, a rare syndrome that presents by abnormal changes in the skin, nails and mucous membrane. Some ultimate effects of this disease include bone-marrow failure as well as cancer. This syndrome has been shown to arise from mutations in multiple genes, including dyskerin, telomerase RNA and telomerase reverse transcriptase.

Prader–Willi syndrome – This syndrome affects as many as 1 in 12,000 people and has a presentation of extreme hunger, cognitive and behavioural problems, poor muscle tone and short stature. The syndrome has been linked to the deletion of a region of paternal chromosome 15 that is not expressed on the maternal chromosome. This region includes a brain-specific snRNA that targets the serotonin-2C receptor mRNA.

Medulloblastoma – The U1 snRNA is mutated in a subset of these brain tumors, and leads to altered RNA splicing. The mutations predominantly occur in adult tumors, and are associated with poor prognosis.

== Post-transcriptional modification ==
In eukaryotes, snRNAs contain a significant amount of 2′-O-methylation modifications and pseudouridylations. These modifications are associated with snoRNA activity which canonically modify pre-mature rRNAs but have been observed in modifying other cellular RNA targets such as snRNAs. Finally, oligo-adenylation (short poly(A)tailing) can determine the fate of snRNAs (that are usually not poly(A)-tailed) and thereby induce their RNA decay. This mechanism regulating the abundance of snRNAs is in turn coupled to a widespread change of alternative RNA splicing.

== See also ==
- MicroRNA
