= Gem-associated protein =

In molecular biology, gem-associated protein (GEMIN) may refer to:

- Gem-associated protein 2
- Gem-associated protein 3
- Gem-associated protein 4
- Gem-associated protein 5
- Gem-associated protein 6
- Gem-associated protein 7
- Gem-associated protein 8
