= Gideon Dreyfuss =

American biochemist

- Born: New York City, New York, United States
- Died: 2026
- Education: Hebrew University of Jerusalem (undergraduate), Harvard University (PhD), Massachusetts Institute of Technology (Post-doctoral)
- Known for: Discovering and naming several hnRNP's and the proteins associated with SMN, for which loss of function is the primary cause of SMA,
- Scientific career
- Fields: Biochemistry, Molecular Biology
- Workplaces: University of Pennsylvania, Howard Hughes Medical Institute, National Academy of Sciences, Northwestern University (formerly)
- Thesis: On cyclic AMP-dependent protein kinases (1978)
- Doctoral advisor: Elkan Blout
- Other academic advisors: David Baltimore

Gideon Dreyfuss is an American biochemist, the Isaac Norris Professor of Biochemistry and Biophysics at the University of Pennsylvania School of Medicine, and was an investigator of the Howard Hughes Medical Institute during 1990-2021. He was elected to the National Academy of Sciences in 2012.

Dreyfuss received his Ph.D. in biological chemistry in 1978 from Harvard University and is a fellow of the American Academy of Arts and Sciences.

== Research ==
Dreyfuss is interested in various projects studying the function and biogenesis of non-coding RNA and the proteins that interact with RNA. A primary research goal of his lab is to elucidate the function of Survival of Motor Neuron protein, SMN, which assembles a heptameric ring of Sm proteins on U snRNAs to form snRNPs that are essential components of the splicesome. Moreover, loss of functional SMN is directly linked to spinal muscular atrophy, a debilitating neurodegenerative disease that is characterize by the eventual death of motor neurons and muscular wasting. Dreyfuss has conducted research to understand the role of SMN in SMA pathology and using high throughput screening to discover potential therapeutics. The lab also studies the dynamic mechanism of RNA splicing, the RNA-binding proteins that determine exonic specificity, and snRNAs, that are important regulators of splicing and mRNA maturation.

== Genes or Gene Functions Discovered ==
- eIF4A3
- FXR1
- FXR2
- Gemin2 (Previously known as SIP1)
- Gemin3/DDX20
- Gemin4
- Gemin5
- Gemin6
- Gemin7
- hnRNPA1
- RA33
- hnRNPC
- PTBP1
- hnRNPK
- hnRNPM
- hnRNPR
- hnRNPU
- hnRNPQ
- Y14
- Magoh

== See also ==
- SMN1
- SMN2
- Spinal muscular atrophy
- Heterogeneous ribonucleoprotein particle
- Spliceosome
