= Survival of motor neuron =

Protein in animal cells

Survival motor neuron protein
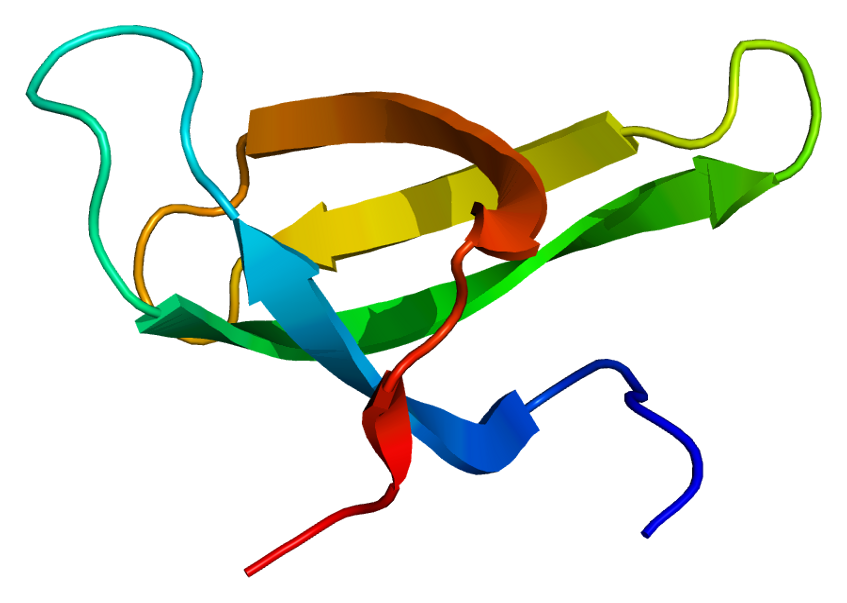
- Tudor domain from human SMN. PDB 1g5v

Identifiers
- Symbol: SMN
- Pfam: PF06003
- Pfam clan: CL0049
- InterPro: IPR010304
- SCOP2: 1mhn / SCOPe / SUPFAM
Available protein structures:
- PDB: IPR010304 PF06003 (ECOD; PDBsum)
- AlphaFold: IPR010304; PF06003

Survival of motor neuron or survival motor neuron (SMN) is a protein that in humans is encoded by the SMN1 and SMN2 genes.

SMN is found in the cytoplasm of all animal cells and also in the nuclear gems. It functions in transcriptional regulation, telomerase regeneration and cellular trafficking. SMN deficiency, primarily due to mutations in SMN1, results in widespread splicing defects, especially in spinal motor neurons, and is one cause of spinal muscular atrophy. Research also showed a possible role of SMN in neuronal migration and/or differentiation.

== Function ==
The SMN protein contains GEMIN2-binding, Tudor and YG-Box domains. It localizes to both the cytoplasm and the nucleus. Within the nucleus, the protein localizes to subnuclear bodies called gems which are found near coiled bodies containing high concentrations of small ribonucleoproteins (snRNPs). This protein forms heteromeric complexes with proteins such as GEMIN2 and GEMIN4, and also interacts with several proteins known to be involved in the biogenesis of snRNPs, such as hnRNP U protein and the small nucleolar RNA binding protein.

== SMN complex ==
SMN complex refers to the entire multi-protein complex involved in the assembly of snRNPs, the essential components of spliceosomal machinery. The complex, apart from the "proper" survival of motor neuron protein, includes at least six other proteins (gem-associated protein 2, 3, 4, 5, 6 and 7.

== Interactions ==
SMN has been shown to interact with:

- Bcl-2,
- Coilin,
- DDX20,
- DHX9,
- FBL,
- FUBP1,
- GAR1,
- GEMIN2,
- GEMIN4,
- GEMIN5,
- GEMIN7,
- HNRNPR,
- KPNB1,
- P53,
- SNRPD1, and
- SNRPD2.

== Evolutionary conservation ==
SMN is evolutionarily conserved including the Fungi kingdom, though only fungal organisms with a great number of introns have the Smn gene (or the splicing factor spf30 paralogue). Surprisingly, these are filamentous fungus which have mycelia, so suggesting analogy to the neuronal axons.

== See also ==
- Gideon Dreyfuss
