= GEMIN8 =

Protein-coding gene in humans

Identifiers
- Aliases: GEMIN8, FAM51A1, gem nuclear organelle associated protein 8
- External IDs: OMIM: 300962; MGI: 2384300; GeneCards: GEMIN8

Gene location (Human)
Chr.	X chromosome (human)
Band	Xp22.2	Start	14,006,726 bp
Band	Xp22.2	End	14,029,893 bp

Gene location (Mouse)
Chr.	X chromosome (mouse)
Band	X|X F5	Start	164,953,450 bp
Band	X|X F5	End	164,973,508 bp
RNA expression pattern
Bgee	Human / Mouse (ortholog); Top expressed in: right uterine tube; left ovary; C1 segment; right ovary; tibial nerve; body of uterus; Descending thoracic aorta; left lobe of thyroid gland; right lobe of thyroid gland; left uterine tube / Top expressed in: zygote; embryo; ventricular zone; tail of embryo; embryo; genital tubercle; Rostral migratory stream; dentate gyrus of hippocampal formation granule cell; right kidney; neural layer of retina; More reference expression data
BioGPS	n/a
Gene ontology
Molecular function	protein binding
Cellular component	cytoplasm; SMN-Sm protein complex; nucleus; gemini of coiled bodies; nucleoplasm; cytosol; SMN complex
Biological process	mRNA processing; RNA splicing; import into nucleus; spliceosomal snRNP assembly
Sources:Amigo / QuickGO
Orthologs
Databases	NCBI: entry; OMA: entry
Species	Human	Mouse
Entrez	54960	237221
Ensembl	ENSG00000046647	ENSMUSG00000040621
UniProt	Q9NWZ8	Q8BHE1
RefSeq (mRNA)	NM_001042479; NM_001042480; NM_017856	NM_146238; NM_001310722; NM_001310724
RefSeq (protein)	NP_001035944; NP_001035945; NP_060326	NP_001297651; NP_001297653; NP_666350
Location (UCSC)	Chr X: 14.01 – 14.03 Mb	Chr X: 164.95 – 164.97 Mb
PubMed search
- Wikidata
View/Edit Human	View/Edit Mouse

Gem-associated protein 8 (Gemin-8) is a protein that in humans is encoded by the GEMIN8 gene.

== Function ==
Gemin-8 is part of the SMN complex, which is necessary for spliceosomal snRNP assembly in the cytoplasm and pre-mRNA splicing in the nucleus. Gemin-8 binds to both SMN1 and the GEMIN6 / GEMIN7 heterodimer, mediating their interaction. This protein is found in nuclear Gemini of Cajal bodies (gems) and in the cytoplasm. Three transcript variants encoding the same protein have been found for this gene.
