= Gem-associated protein 5 =

Protein-coding gene in the species Homo sapiens

GEMIN5

Identifiers
- Aliases: GEMIN5, GEMIN-5, gem nuclear organelle associated protein 5, NEDCAM
- External IDs: OMIM: 607005; MGI: 2449311; GeneCards: GEMIN5

Gene location (Human)
Chr.	Chromosome 5 (human)
Band	5q33.2	Start	154,887,411 bp
Band	5q33.2	End	154,938,211 bp

Gene location (Mouse)
Chr.	Chromosome 11 (mouse)
Band	11|11 B1.3	Start	58,010,828 bp
Band	11|11 B1.3	End	58,059,365 bp
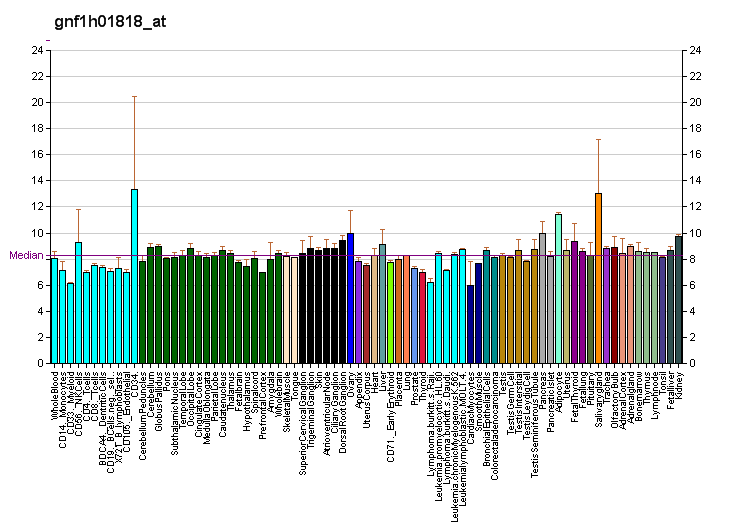

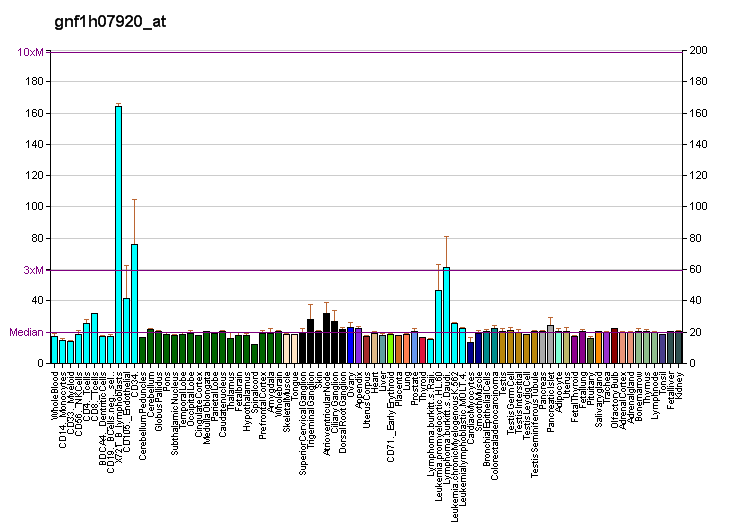

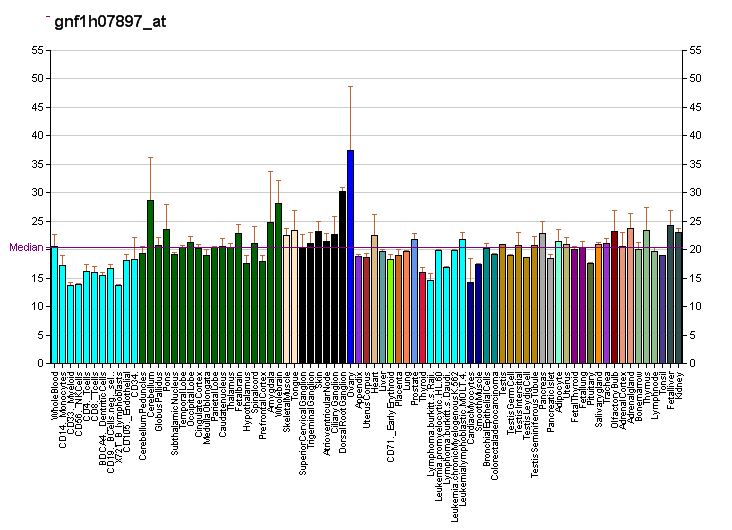
RNA expression pattern
Bgee	Human / Mouse (ortholog); Top expressed in: oocyte; secondary oocyte; tibialis anterior muscle; gonad; deltoid muscle; ventricular zone; biceps brachii; Skeletal muscle tissue of biceps brachii; gastrocnemius muscle; quadriceps femoris muscle / Top expressed in: spermatocyte; spermatid; epiblast; tail of embryo; seminiferous tubule; internal carotid artery; morula; morula; genital tubercle; intestinal villus; More reference expression data
BioGPS	More reference expression data
Gene ontology
Molecular function	snRNA binding; protein binding; RNA 7-methylguanosine cap binding; mRNA 3'-UTR binding; U1 snRNA binding; U4 snRNA binding; U4atac snRNA binding; ribosome binding; RNA binding
Cellular component	cytoplasm; SMN complex; SMN-Sm protein complex; cytosol; nuclear body; membrane; gemini of coiled bodies; nucleoplasm; nucleus; cytosolic large ribosomal subunit; SMN-Gemin2 complex
Biological process	mRNA splicing, via spliceosome; mRNA processing; RNA splicing; spliceosomal snRNP assembly; import into nucleus; protein biosynthesis; regulation of translation; protein-containing complex assembly
Sources:Amigo / QuickGO
Orthologs
Databases	NCBI: entry; OMA: entry
Species	Human	Mouse
Entrez	25929	216766
Ensembl	ENSG00000082516	ENSMUSG00000037275
UniProt	Q8TEQ6	Q8BX17
RefSeq (mRNA)	NM_015465; NM_001252156	NM_001166669; NM_001166670; NM_001166671; NM_172558; NM_001374702
RefSeq (protein)	NP_001239085; NP_056280	NP_001160141; NP_001160142; NP_001160143; NP_766146; NP_001361631
Location (UCSC)	Chr 5: 154.89 – 154.94 Mb	Chr 11: 58.01 – 58.06 Mb
PubMed search
- Wikidata
View/Edit Human	View/Edit Mouse

Gem-associated protein 5 is a protein that in humans is encoded by the GEMIN5 gene.

== Function ==
Gem-associated protein 5 is part of the SMN a large protein complex localized to both the cytoplasm and the nucleus that plays a role in the cytoplasmic assembly of small nuclear ribonucleoproteins (snRNPs). Other members of this complex include SMN (MIM 600354), gem-associated protein 2 (SIP1; MIM 602595), GEMIN3 (DDX20; MIM 606168), and GEMIN4 (MIM 606969).

== Interactions ==
GEMIN5 has been shown to interact with DDX20 and SMN1.
