= LSM1 =

Protein-coding gene in the species Homo sapiens

Identifiers
- Aliases: LSM1, CASM, YJL124C, LSM1 homolog, mRNA degradation associated
- External IDs: OMIM: 607281; MGI: 1914457; GeneCards: LSM1

Gene location (Mouse)
Chr.	Chromosome 8 (mouse)
Band	8|8 A2	Start	26,275,316 bp
Band	8|8 A2	End	26,294,003 bp
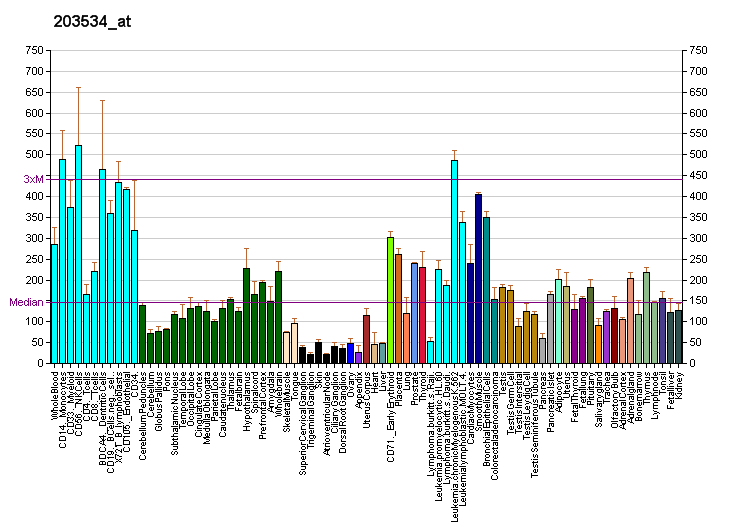
RNA expression pattern
Bgee	Human / Mouse (ortholog); Top expressed in: parotid gland; hair follicle; right ventricle; renal medulla; saphenous vein; cardia; monocyte; vena cava; external globus pallidus; body of tongue / Top expressed in: renal corpuscle; medullary collecting duct; epithelium of lens; facial motor nucleus; medial ganglionic eminence; embryo; neural tube; ectoderm; epiblast; otic vesicle; More reference expression data
BioGPS	More reference expression data
Gene ontology
Molecular function	protein binding; RNA cap binding; pre-mRNA binding; mRNA binding; RNA binding
Cellular component	cytosol; P-body; messenger ribonucleoprotein complex; axon; soma; dendrite; nucleus; cytoplasm; mRNA cap binding complex; Lsm1-7-Pat1 complex
Biological process	negative regulation of neuron differentiation; deadenylation-dependent decapping of nuclear-transcribed mRNA; RNA splicing, via transesterification reactions; mRNA processing; stem cell population maintenance; RNA splicing; exonucleolytic catabolism of deadenylated mRNA; histone mRNA catabolic process; nuclear-transcribed mRNA catabolic process; RNA metabolic process
Sources:Amigo / QuickGO
Orthologs
Databases	NCBI: entry
Species	Human	Mouse
Entrez	27257	67207
Ensembl	n/a	ENSMUSG00000037296
UniProt	O15116	Q8VC85
RefSeq (mRNA)	NM_014462	NM_026032
RefSeq (protein)	NP_055277	NP_080308
Location (UCSC)	n/a	Chr 8: 26.28 – 26.29 Mb
PubMed search
- Wikidata
View/Edit Human	View/Edit Mouse

U6 snRNA-associated Sm-like protein LSm1 is a protein that in humans is encoded by the LSM1 gene.

== Function ==
Sm-like proteins were identified in a variety of organisms based on sequence homology with the Sm protein family (see SNRPD2). Sm-like proteins contain the Sm sequence motif, which consists of 2 regions separated by a linker of variable length that folds as a loop. The Sm-like proteins are thought to form a stable heteromer present in tri-snRNP particles, which are important for pre-mRNA splicing.
