= LSM7 =

Protein-coding gene in the species Homo sapiens

Identifiers
- Aliases: LSM7, YNL147W, LSM7 homolog, U6 small nuclear RNA and mRNA degradation associated
- External IDs: OMIM: 607287; MGI: 1913344; GeneCards: LSM7
Available structures
PDB	Ortholog search: PDBe RCSB
PDB	List of PDB id codes 3JCR

Gene location (Human)
Chr.	Chromosome 19 (human)
Band	19p13.3	Start	2,321,520 bp
Band	19p13.3	End	2,328,611 bp

Gene location (Mouse)
Chr.	Chromosome 10 (mouse)
Band	10|10 C1	Start	80,688,655 bp
Band	10|10 C1	End	80,691,043 bp
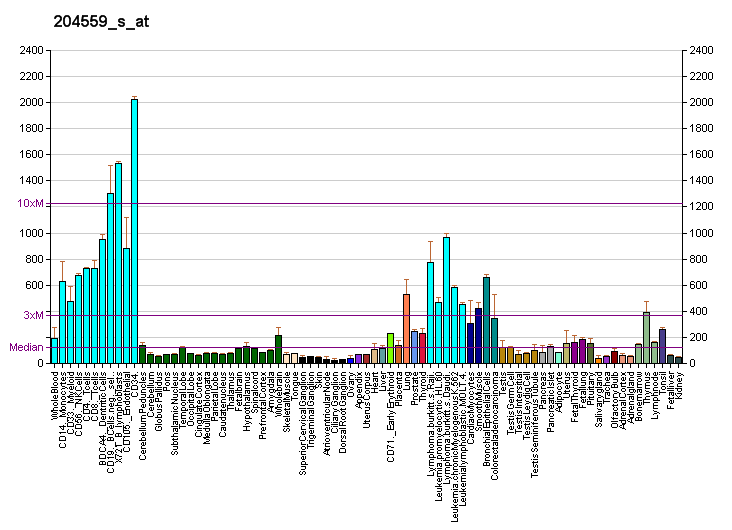
RNA expression pattern
Bgee	Human / Mouse (ortholog); Top expressed in: mucosa of transverse colon; granulocyte; ganglionic eminence; pituitary gland; ventricular zone; spleen; anterior pituitary; monocyte; C1 segment; left ovary / Top expressed in: embryo; yolk sac; embryo; blastocyst; morula; ventricular zone; dentate gyrus of hippocampal formation granule cell; neural layer of retina; lip; thymus; More reference expression data
BioGPS	More reference expression data
Gene ontology
Molecular function	protein binding; RNA binding; U6 snRNA binding
Cellular component	cytosol; catalytic step 2 spliceosome; spliceosomal tri-snRNP complex; U6 snRNP; U12-type spliceosomal complex; nucleoplasm; Lsm1-7-Pat1 complex; spliceosomal complex; U2-type prespliceosome; nucleus; U4/U6 x U5 tri-snRNP complex; U2-type precatalytic spliceosome; Lsm2-8 complex
Biological process	mRNA splicing, via spliceosome; RNA processing; mRNA processing; exonucleolytic catabolism of deadenylated mRNA; RNA splicing; nuclear-transcribed mRNA catabolic process
Sources:Amigo / QuickGO
Orthologs
Databases	NCBI: entry; OMA: entry
Species	Human	Mouse
Entrez	51690	66094
Ensembl	ENSG00000130332	ENSMUSG00000035215
UniProt	Q9UK45	Q9CQQ8
RefSeq (mRNA)	NM_016199	NM_025349; NM_001359148; NM_001359149; NM_001359150
RefSeq (protein)	NP_057283	NP_079625; NP_001346077; NP_001346078; NP_001346079
Location (UCSC)	Chr 19: 2.32 – 2.33 Mb	Chr 10: 80.69 – 80.69 Mb
PubMed search
- Wikidata
View/Edit Human	View/Edit Mouse

U6 snRNA-associated Sm-like protein LSm7 is a protein that in humans is encoded by the LSM7 gene.

== Function ==
Sm-like proteins were identified in a variety of organisms based on sequence homology with the Sm protein family (see SNRPD2; MIM 601061). Sm-like proteins contain the Sm sequence motif, which consists of 2 regions separated by a linker of variable length that folds as a loop. The Sm-like proteins are thought to form a stable heteromer present in tri-snRNP particles, which are important for pre-mRNA splicing.[supplied by OMIM]

== Interactions ==
LSM7 has been shown to interact with TACC1 and LSM2.
