= Zinc finger protein ZPR1 =

Protein-coding gene in the species Homo sapiens

ZPR1

Identifiers
- Aliases: ZPR1, ZNF259, ZPR1 zinc finger, GKAF
- External IDs: OMIM: 603901; MGI: 1330262; GeneCards: ZPR1

Gene location (Human)
Chr.	Chromosome 11 (human)
Band	11q23.3	Start	116,773,799 bp
Band	11q23.3	End	116,788,039 bp

Gene location (Mouse)
Chr.	Chromosome 9 (mouse)
Band	9|9 A5.2	Start	46,184,362 bp
Band	9|9 A5.2	End	46,193,941 bp
RNA expression pattern
Bgee	Human / Mouse (ortholog); Top expressed in: ganglionic eminence; right testis; sperm; left testis; islet of Langerhans; sural nerve; Achilles tendon; body of pancreas; right lobe of liver; smooth muscle tissue / Top expressed in: epiblast; tail of embryo; embryo; Rostral migratory stream; embryo; seminiferous tubule; genital tubercle; muscle of thigh; yolk sac; morula; More reference expression data
BioGPS	n/a
Gene ontology
Molecular function	receptor tyrosine kinase binding; zinc ion binding; metal ion binding; protein binding; translation initiation factor binding
Cellular component	cytoplasm; perikaryon; Cajal body; cell projection; growth cone; nucleoplasm; SMN complex; axon; soma; nucleolus; perinuclear region of cytoplasm; nucleus; gemini of coiled bodies
Biological process	cell differentiation; axon development; pre-mRNA catabolic process; Cajal body organization; mRNA processing; apoptotic process involved in development; positive regulation of growth; inner cell mass cell proliferation; cellular response to epidermal growth factor stimulus; positive regulation of gene expression; regulation of myelination; positive regulation of transcription involved in G1/S transition of mitotic cell cycle; RNA splicing; spinal cord development; positive regulation of RNA splicing; positive regulation of protein import into nucleus; cell population proliferation; DNA endoreduplication; microtubule cytoskeleton organization; trophectodermal cell proliferation; signal transduction; negative regulation of motor neuron apoptotic process
Sources:Amigo / QuickGO
Orthologs
Databases	NCBI: entry; OMA: entry
Species	Human	Mouse
Entrez	8882	22687
Ensembl	ENSG00000109917	ENSMUSG00000032078
UniProt	O75312	Q62384
RefSeq (mRNA)	NM_003904; NM_001317086	NM_011752
RefSeq (protein)	NP_001304015; NP_003895	NP_035882
Location (UCSC)	Chr 11: 116.77 – 116.79 Mb	Chr 9: 46.18 – 46.19 Mb
PubMed search
- Wikidata
View/Edit Human	View/Edit Mouse

Zinc finger protein ZPR1 is a protein that in humans is encoded by the ZPR1 gene (previously ZNF259). Through its interaction with the protein survival motor neuron 1 (SMN1), the ZPR1 protein promotes RNA splicing, and induces additional neuronal differentiation and axon growth. Pathogenic mutations in this gene have been associated with a developmental disorder involving growth restriction, hypoplastic kidneys, alopecia, and distinctive facies (GKAF).
