= AAR2 =

Gene that encodes a protein essential for pre-mRNA splicing

Identifiers
- Aliases: AAR2, C20orf4, CGI-23, AAR2 splicing factor homolog, AAR2 splicing factor
- External IDs: OMIM: 617365; MGI: 1915545; GeneCards: AAR2

Gene location (Human)
Chr.	Chromosome 20 (human)
Band	20q11.23	Start	36,236,131 bp
Band	20q11.23	End	36,270,918 bp

Gene location (Mouse)
Chr.	Chromosome 2 (mouse)
Band	2|2 H1	Start	156,389,504 bp
Band	2|2 H1	End	156,410,892 bp
RNA expression pattern
Bgee	Human / Mouse (ortholog); Top expressed in: smooth muscle tissue; popliteal artery; tibial arteries; gonad; muscle layer of sigmoid colon; right adrenal cortex; right coronary artery; pancreatic ductal cell; islet of Langerhans; left coronary artery / Top expressed in: spermatocyte; interventricular septum; lumbar spinal ganglion; Paneth cell; muscle of thigh; Epithelium of choroid plexus; right kidney; substantia nigra; dentate gyrus of hippocampal formation granule cell; spermatid; More reference expression data
BioGPS	n/a
Orthologs
Databases	NCBI: entry; OMA: entry
Species	Human	Mouse
Entrez	25980	68295
Ensembl	ENSG00000131043	ENSMUSG00000027628
UniProt	Q9Y312	Q9D2V5
RefSeq (mRNA)	NM_001271874; NM_015511	NM_001164818; NM_026661
RefSeq (protein)	NP_001258803; NP_056326	NP_001158290; NP_080937
Location (UCSC)	Chr 20: 36.24 – 36.27 Mb	Chr 2: 156.39 – 156.41 Mb
PubMed search
- Wikidata
View/Edit Human	View/Edit Mouse

AAR2 splicing factor is a protein that in humans is encoded by the gene AAR2. This protein is essential for pre-mRNA splicing, a step in post-transcriptional modification of RNA. The AAR2 protein is part of the U5 small nuclear ribonucleoprotein complex (snRNP), and it plays a role in a component of the spliceosome. In humans, the AAR2 gene is on chromosme 20.
