= Small nuclear ribonucleoprotein D1 =

Protein-coding gene in the species Homo sapiens

SNRPD1
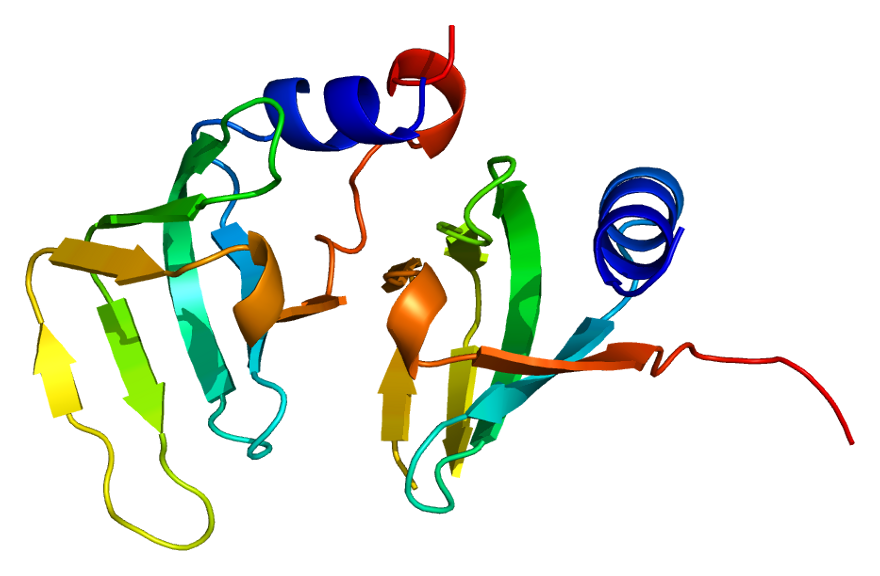

Identifiers
- Aliases: SNRPD1, HsT2456, SMD1, SNRPD, Sm-D1, Small nuclear ribonucleoprotein D1, small nuclear ribonucleoprotein D1 polypeptide
- External IDs: OMIM: 601063; MGI: 98344; GeneCards: SNRPD1
Available structures
PDB	Ortholog search: PDBe RCSB
PDB	List of PDB id codes 1B34, 3CW1, 3PGW, 3S6N, 4F7U, 4PJO, 4V98, 4WZJ, 3JCR

Gene location (Human)
Chr.	Chromosome 18 (human)
Band	18q11.2	Start	21,612,314 bp
Band	18q11.2	End	21,633,524 bp

Gene location (Mouse)
Chr.	Chromosome 18 (mouse)
Band	18|18 A1	Start	10,617,775 bp
Band	18|18 A1	End	10,642,079 bp
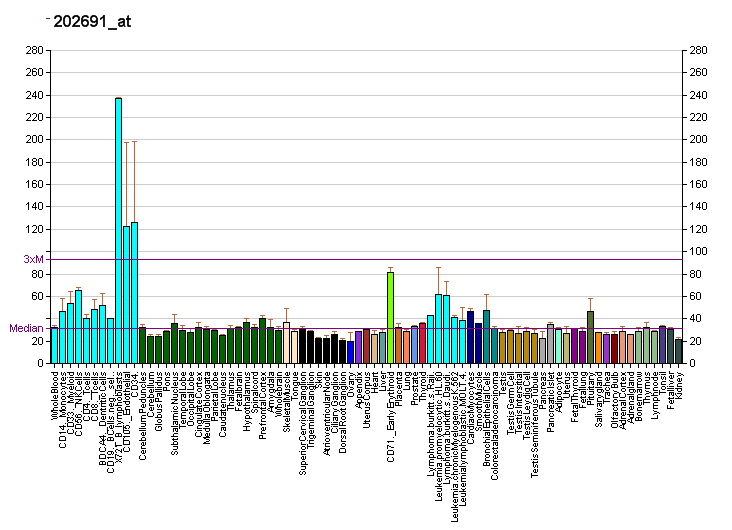

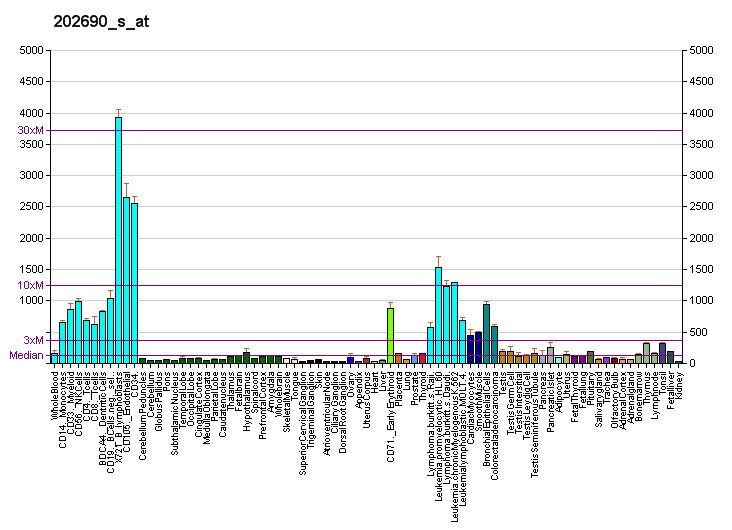
RNA expression pattern
Bgee	Human / Mouse (ortholog); Top expressed in: ganglionic eminence; ventricular zone; oocyte; mucosa of sigmoid colon; mucosa of pharynx; oral cavity; mucosa of transverse colon; olfactory zone of nasal mucosa; islet of Langerhans; appendix / Top expressed in: somite; epiblast; mandibular prominence; maxillary prominence; embryo; abdominal wall; embryo; medial ganglionic eminence; ventricular zone; hand; More reference expression data
BioGPS	More reference expression data
Gene ontology
Molecular function	protein binding; U1 snRNP binding; RNA binding
Cellular component	cytoplasm; SMN-Sm protein complex; cytosol; prespliceosome; catalytic step 2 spliceosome; spliceosomal tri-snRNP complex; U5 snRNP; U12-type spliceosomal complex; U2 snRNP; nucleoplasm; methylosome; precatalytic spliceosome; small nuclear ribonucleoprotein complex; pICln-Sm protein complex; spliceosomal complex; commitment complex; U4 snRNP; nucleus; U1 snRNP; U4/U6 x U5 tri-snRNP complex; U2-type precatalytic spliceosome; U2-type catalytic step 2 spliceosome
Biological process	mRNA splicing, via spliceosome; RNA processing; mRNA processing; spliceosomal complex assembly; RNA splicing; import into nucleus; spliceosomal snRNP assembly
Sources:Amigo / QuickGO
Orthologs
Databases	NCBI: entry; OMA: entry
Species	Human	Mouse
Entrez	6632	20641
Ensembl	ENSG00000167088	ENSMUSG00000002477
UniProt	P62314	P62315
RefSeq (mRNA)	NM_006938; NM_001291916	NM_009226
RefSeq (protein)	NP_001278845; NP_008869	NP_033252
Location (UCSC)	Chr 18: 21.61 – 21.63 Mb	Chr 18: 10.62 – 10.64 Mb
PubMed search
- Wikidata
View/Edit Human	View/Edit Mouse

Small nuclear ribonucleoprotein Sm D1 is a protein that in humans is encoded by the SNRPD1 gene.

== Function ==
This gene encodes a small nuclear ribonucleoprotein that belongs to the SNRNP core protein family. The protein may act as a charged protein scaffold to promote SNRNP assembly or strengthen SNRNP-SNRNP interactions through nonspecific electrostatic contacts with RNA.

== Interactions ==
Small nuclear ribonucleoprotein D1 has been shown to interact with:

- CDC5L,
- CLNS1A,
- DDX20,
- SMN1, and
- Small nuclear ribonucleoprotein D2
