= Gem-associated protein 4 =

Protein-coding gene in the species Homo sapiens

GEMIN4

Identifiers
- Aliases: GEMIN4, HC56, HCAP1, HHRF-1, p97, gem nuclear organelle associated protein 4, NEDMCR
- External IDs: OMIM: 606969; MGI: 2449313; GeneCards: GEMIN4

Gene location (Human)
Chr.	Chromosome 17 (human)
Band	17p13.3	Start	744,421 bp
Band	17p13.3	End	753,999 bp

Gene location (Mouse)
Chr.	Chromosome 11 (mouse)
Band	11|11 B5	Start	76,101,397 bp
Band	11|11 B5	End	76,108,490 bp
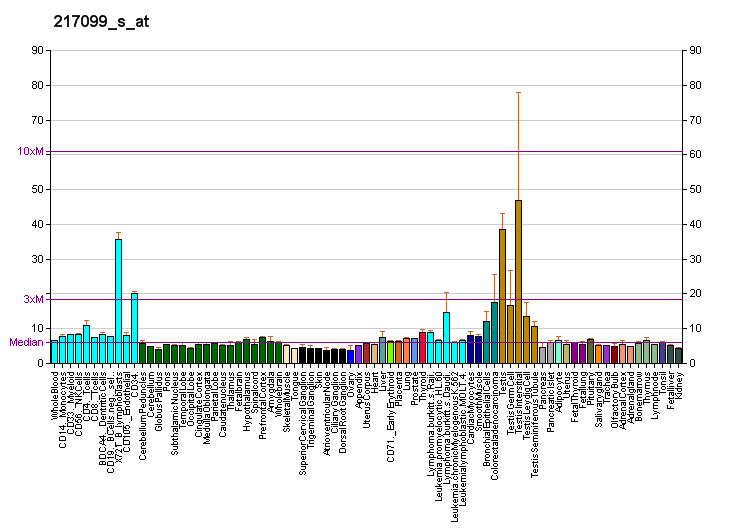

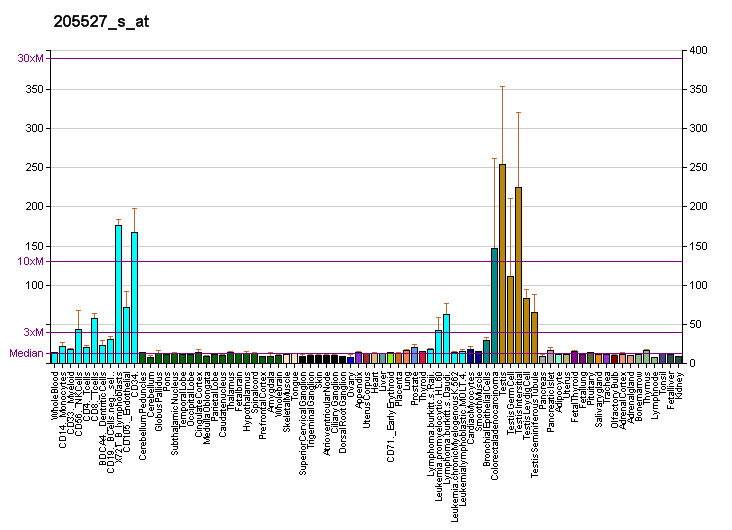
RNA expression pattern
Bgee	Human / Mouse (ortholog); Top expressed in: sperm; left testis; right testis; skin of abdomen; skin of leg; gonad; gingival epithelium; left ovary; body of stomach; right ovary / Top expressed in: spermatid; testicle; epiblast; esophagus; embryo; embryo; yolk sac; spermatocyte; mesencephalon; uterus; More reference expression data
BioGPS	More reference expression data
Gene ontology
Molecular function	protein binding
Cellular component	SMN-Sm protein complex; cytosol; nucleolus; small nuclear ribonucleoprotein complex; extracellular exosome; membrane; gemini of coiled bodies; nucleoplasm; SMN complex; nucleus; cytoplasm; nuclear body
Biological process	mRNA processing; RNA splicing; import into nucleus; spliceosomal snRNP assembly; rRNA processing
Sources:Amigo / QuickGO
Orthologs
Databases	NCBI: entry; OMA: entry
Species	Human	Mouse
Entrez	50628	276919
Ensembl	ENSG00000179409	ENSMUSG00000049396
UniProt	P57678	Q6P6L6
RefSeq (mRNA)	NM_015721	NM_177367
RefSeq (protein)	NP_056536	NP_796341
Location (UCSC)	Chr 17: 0.74 – 0.75 Mb	Chr 11: 76.1 – 76.11 Mb
PubMed search
- Wikidata
View/Edit Human	View/Edit Mouse

Gem-associated protein 4 is a protein that in humans is encoded by the GEMIN4 gene.

== Function ==
The product of this gene is part of the SMN protein complex localized to the cytoplasm, nucleoli, and to discrete nuclear bodies called Gemini bodies (gems). The complex functions in spliceosomal snRNP assembly in the cytoplasm, and regenerates spliceosomes required for pre-mRNA splicing in the nucleus. The encoded protein directly interacts with a DEAD box protein and several spliceosome core proteins. Alternatively spliced transcript variants have been described, but their biological validity has not been determined.

== Interactions ==
GEMIN4 has been shown to interact with:

- DDX20,
- EIF2C2,
- LGALS1 and
- SMN1.
