= Small nuclear ribonucleoprotein polypeptide F =

Protein-coding gene in the species Homo sapiens

SNRPF

Identifiers
- Aliases: SNRPF, SMF, Sm-F, snRNP-F, Small nuclear ribonucleoprotein polypeptide F
- External IDs: OMIM: 603541; MGI: 1917128; GeneCards: SNRPF
Available structures
PDB	Ortholog search: PDBe RCSB
PDB	List of PDB id codes 3CW1, 3PGW, 3S6N, 4F7U, 4PJO, 4V98, 4WZJ, 3JCR

Gene location (Human)
Chr.	Chromosome 12 (human)
Band	12q23.1	Start	95,858,952 bp
Band	12q23.1	End	95,903,828 bp

Gene location (Mouse)
Chr.	Chromosome 10 (mouse)
Band	10|10 C2	Start	93,418,891 bp
Band	10|10 C2	End	93,425,568 bp
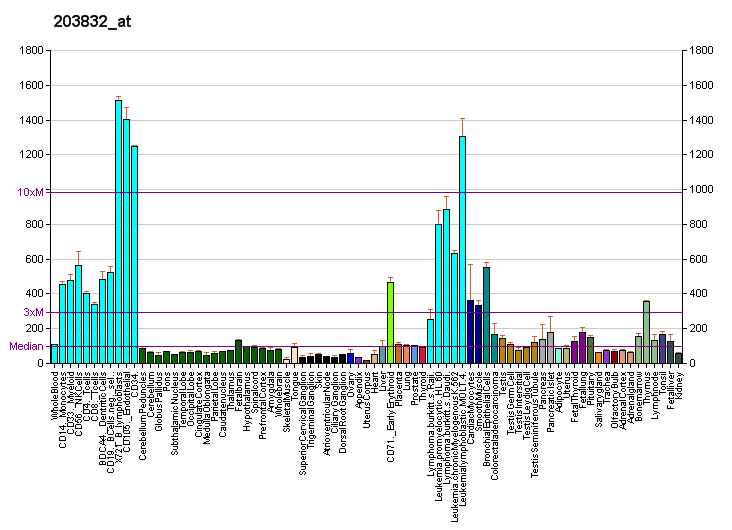
RNA expression pattern
Bgee	Human / Mouse (ortholog); Top expressed in: oocyte; embryo; ganglionic eminence; epithelium of colon; ventricular zone; mucosa of pharynx; bone marrow; mucosa of transverse colon; oral cavity; pericardium / Top expressed in: yolk sac; embryo; embryo; epiblast; ventricular zone; ganglionic eminence; lens; zygote; neural tube; placenta; More reference expression data
BioGPS	More reference expression data
Gene ontology
Molecular function	protein binding; RNA binding
Cellular component	U4 snRNP; SMN-Sm protein complex; pICln-Sm protein complex; nucleus; U7 snRNP; catalytic step 2 spliceosome; U1 snRNP; cytoplasm; sno(s)RNA-containing ribonucleoprotein complex; nucleoplasm; small nuclear ribonucleoprotein complex; U12-type spliceosomal complex; methylosome; cytosol; spliceosomal complex; U2-type catalytic step 2 spliceosome; U4/U6 x U5 tri-snRNP complex; U2-type precatalytic spliceosome
Biological process	termination of RNA polymerase II transcription; histone mRNA metabolic process; mRNA processing; mRNA splicing, via spliceosome; RNA splicing; import into nucleus; spliceosomal snRNP assembly
Sources:Amigo / QuickGO
Orthologs
Databases	NCBI: entry; OMA: entry
Species	Human	Mouse
Entrez	6636	69878
Ensembl	ENSG00000139343	ENSMUSG00000020018
UniProt	P62306	P62307
RefSeq (mRNA)	NM_003095; NM_001394209	NM_027246
RefSeq (protein)	NP_003086	NP_081522
Location (UCSC)	Chr 12: 95.86 – 95.9 Mb	Chr 10: 93.42 – 93.43 Mb
PubMed search
- Wikidata
View/Edit Human	View/Edit Mouse

Small nuclear ribonucleoprotein F is a protein that in humans is encoded by the SNRPF gene.

== Interactions ==
Small nuclear ribonucleoprotein polypeptide F has been shown to interact with DDX20, Small nuclear ribonucleoprotein D2 and Small nuclear ribonucleoprotein polypeptide E.
