= SnRNP =

Protein complexes that mix with other proteins to form spliceosome

snRNPs (pronounced "snurps"), or small nuclear ribonucleoproteins, are RNA-protein complexes that combine with unmodified pre-mRNA and various other proteins to form a spliceosome, a large RNA-protein molecular complex upon which splicing of pre-mRNA occurs. The action of snRNPs is essential to the removal of introns from pre-mRNA, a critical aspect of post-transcriptional modification of RNA, occurring only in the nucleus of eukaryotic cells. Additionally, U7 snRNP is not involved in splicing at all, as U7 snRNP is responsible for processing the 3′ stem-loop of histone pre-mRNA.

The two essential components of snRNPs are protein molecules and RNA. The RNA found within each snRNP particle is known as small nuclear RNA, or snRNA, and is usually about 150 nucleotides in length. The snRNA component of the snRNP gives specificity to individual introns by "recognizing" the sequences of critical splicing signals at the 5' and 3' ends and branch site of introns. The snRNA in snRNPs is similar to ribosomal RNA in that it directly incorporates both an enzymatic and a structural role.

SnRNPs were discovered by Michael R. Lerner and Joan A. Steitz. Thomas R. Cech and Sidney Altman also played a role in the discovery, winning the Nobel Prize for Chemistry in 1989 for their independent discoveries that RNA can act as a catalyst in cell development.

== Types ==
At least five different kinds of snRNPs join the spliceosome to participate in splicing. They can be visualized by gel electrophoresis and are known individually as: U1, U2, U4, U5, and U6. Their snRNA components are known, respectively, as: U1 snRNA, U2 snRNA, U4 snRNA, U5 snRNA, and U6 snRNA.

In the mid-1990s, it was discovered that a variant class of snRNPs exists to help in the splicing of a class of introns found only in metazoans, with highly conserved 5' splice sites and branch sites. This variant class of snRNPs includes: U11 snRNA, U12 snRNA, U4atac snRNA, and U6atac snRNA. While different, they perform the same functions as do U1, U2, U4, and U6, respectively.

Additionally, U7 snRNP is made of U7 small nuclear RNA and associated proteins and is involved in the processing of the 3′ stem-loop of histone pre-mRNA.

== Biogenesis ==
Small nuclear ribonucleoproteins (snRNPs) assemble in a tightly orchestrated and regulated process that involves both the cell nucleus and cytoplasm.

=== Synthesis and export of RNA in the nucleus ===
The RNA polymerase II transcribes U1, U2, U4, U5 and the less abundant U11, U12 and U4atac (snRNAs) acquire a m7G-cap which serves as an export signal. Nuclear export is mediated by CRM1.

=== Synthesis and storage of Sm proteins in the cytoplasm ===
The Sm proteins are synthesized in the cytoplasm by ribosomes translating Sm messenger RNA, just like any other protein. These are stored in the cytoplasm in the form of three partially assembled rings complexes all associated with the pICln protein. They are a 6S pentamer complex of SmD1, SmD2, SmF, SmE and SmG with pICln, a 2-4S complex of SmB, possibly with SmD3 and pICln and the 20S methylosome, which is a large complex of SmD3, SmB, SmD1, pICln and the arginine methyltransferase-5 (PRMT5) protein. SmD3, SmB and SmD1 undergo post-translational modification in the methylosome. These three Sm proteins have repeated arginine-glycine motifs in the C-terminal ends of SmD1, SmD3 and SmB, and the arginine side chains modified as symmetric dimethylarginine residues. It has been suggested that pICln, which occurs in all three precursor complexes but is absent in the mature snRNPs, acts as a specialized chaperone, preventing premature assembly of Sm proteins.

=== Assembly of core snRNPs in the SMN complex ===
The snRNAs (U1, U2, U4, U5, and the less abundant U11, U12 and U4atac) quickly interact with the SMN (survival of motor neuron protein); encoded by SMN1 gene) and Gemins 2-8 (Gem-associated proteins: GEMIN2, GEMIN3, GEMIN4, GEMIN5, GEMIN6, GEMIN7, GEMIN8) forming the SMN complex. It is here that the snRNA binds to the SmD1-SmD2-SmF-SmE-SmG pentamer, followed by addition of the SmD3-SmB dimer to complete the Sm ring around the so-called Sm site of the snRNA. This Sm site is a conserved sequence of nucleotides in these snRNAs, typically AUUUGUGG (where A, U and G represent the nucleosides adenosine, uridine and guanosine, respectively). After assembly of the Sm ring around the snRNA, the 5' terminal nucleoside (already modified to a 7-methylguanosine cap) is hyper-methylated to 2,2,7-trimethylguanosine and the other (3') end of the snRNA is trimmed. This modification, and the presence of a complete Sm ring, is recognized by the snurportin 1 protein.

=== Final assembly of the snRNPs in the nucleus ===
The completed core snRNP-snurportin 1 complex is transported into the nucleus via the protein importin β. Inside the nucleus, the core snRNPs appear in the Cajal bodies, where final assembly of the snRNPs take place. This consists of additional proteins and other modifications specific to the particular snRNP (U1, U2, U4, U5). The biogenesis of the U6 snRNP occurs in the nucleus, although large amounts of free U6 are found in the cytoplasm. The LSm ring may assemble first, and then associate with the U6 snRNA.

=== Disassembly of snRNPs ===
The snRNPs are very long-lived, but are assumed to be eventually disassembled and degraded. Little is known about the degradation process.

=== Defective assembly ===
Defective function of the survival of motor neuron (SMN) protein in snRNP biogenesis, caused by a genetic defect in the SMN1 gene which codes for SMN, may account for the motor neuron pathology observed in the genetic disorder spinal muscular atrophy.

== Structures, function and organization ==
Several human and yeast snRNP structures were determined by the cryo-electron microscopy and successive single particle analysis. Recently, the human U1 snRNP core structure was determined by X-ray crystallography (3CW1, 3PGW), followed by a structure of the U4 core snRNP (2Y9A), which yielded first insights into atomic contacts, especially the binding mode of the Sm proteins to the Sm site. The structure of U6 UsnRNA was solved in complex with a specific protein Prp24 (4N0T), as well as a structure of its 3'-nucleotides bound to the special Lsm2-8 protein ring (4M7A). The PDB codes for the respective structures are mentioned in parentheses. The structures determined by single particle electron microscopy analysis are: human U1 snRNP, human U11/U12 di-snRNP, human U5 snRNP, U4/U6 di-snRNP, U4/U6∙U5 tri-snRNP. The further progress determining the structures and functions of snRNPs and spliceosomes continues.

== Anti-snRNP antibodies ==
Autoantibodies may be produced against the body's own snRNPs, most notably the anti-Sm antibodies targeted against the Sm protein type of snRNP specifically in systemic lupus erythematosus (SLE).
