= Michael R. Lerner =

Dr. Michael Rush Lerner
- Born: Portland, Oregon, United States
- Citizenship: United States
- Occupation: Dermatologist
- Known for: Discovery of snRNP; STEP bioassay; research on Smoothened as GPCR
- Medical career
- Profession: Physician
- Field: Dermatology; Molecular biology
- Sub-specialties: Dermatology; Molecular biology; GPCR research
- Research: snRNP; GPCR bioassays

Michael R. Lerner is an American dermatologist and biomedical researcher. He has held academic appointments at Yale University, University of Texas Southwestern Medical Center, and the University of California, San Diego, and has worked in the pharmaceutical industry at Arena Pharmaceuticals.

He discovered snRNPs with Joan A. Steitz, STEP (with Paul Lombroso), created the melanophore-based GPCR bioassay, and demonstrated that Smoothened is a GPCR.

== Early life and education ==
Lerner studied chemistry at the University of Pennsylvania, receiving a Bachelor of Arts degree in 1974. He subsequently attended Yale University School of Medicine, where he earned both a medical degree and a PhD in molecular biophysics and biochemistry in 1981.

== Career ==
In 1979 and 1980 Lerner and Joan A. Steitz published two foundational papers, using autoantibodies from systemic lupus erythematosus patients to isolate and identify snRNPs and establish their crucial function in pre-mRNA splicing.

Lerner rejoined Yale School of Medicine in 1983.

In collaboration with Paul J. Lombroso and Gregory Murdoch, Lerner participated in the molecular characterization of a protein-tyrosine phosphatase enriched in the striatum. The protein was subsequently known as striatal-enriched protein tyrosine phosphatase (STEP), a brain-specific protein-tyrosine phosphatase that has been studied in relation to neuronal signaling and synaptic function.

In 1996, Lerner joined the University of Texas Southwestern Medical Center in Dallas, where he became an associate professor of Dermatology and Pharmacology.

== Awards ==
Lerner's honors include the Charles E. Culpeper Fellowship in 1980, the Wilson S. Stone Memorial Award in 1981, a Helen Hay Whitney Foundation Fellowship in 1983, the Lee C. Howley, Sr. Prize for Arthritis Research in 1984, and a McKnight Scholar award.

He was a scientist with the Howard Hughes Medical Institute from 1986 to 1994.

In 1992, he was elected to the American Society for Clinical Investigation.

== Selected publications ==
- Lerner, Michael R.; Steitz, Joan A. (1979). "Antibodies to small nuclear RNAs complexed with proteins are produced by patients with systemic lupus erythematosus". Proceedings of the National Academy of Sciences 76: 5495–5499.
- Lerner, Michael R.; Boyle, John A.; Mount, Stephen M.; Wolin, Sandra L.; Steitz, Joan A. (1980). "Are snRNPs involved in splicing?". Nature 283: 220–224.
- Lerner, Michael R.; Boyle, John A.; Steitz, Joan A. (1981). "Two novel classes of small ribonucleoproteins detected by antibodies associated with systemic lupus erythematosus". Science 211: 400–402.
- Lerner, Michael R.; Reagan, James; Gyorgyi, Tamas; Roby, Annette (1988). "Olfaction by melanophores: What does it mean?". Proceedings of the National Academy of Sciences 85: 261–264.
- Vogt, Robert G.; Rybczynski, Robert; Lerner, Michael R. (1991). "Molecular cloning and sequencing of General-Odorant Binding Proteins GOBP1 and GOBP2 from the Tobacco Hawk Moth Manduca sexta". Journal of Neuroscience 11: 2972–2984.
- Buzard, Daniel J.; Thatte, Jay; Lerner, Michael; Edwards, John; Jones, Robert M. (2008). "Recent progress in the development of S1P1 receptor agonists for the treatment of inflammatory and autoimmune disorders". Expert Opinion on Therapeutic Patents 18: 1141–1159.
