= LSM3 =

Protein-coding gene in the species Homo sapiens

Identifiers
- Aliases: LSM3, SMX4, USS2, YLR438C, LSM3 homolog, U6 small nuclear RNA and mRNA degradation associated
- External IDs: OMIM: 607283; MGI: 1914928; GeneCards: LSM3
Available structures
PDB	Ortholog search: PDBe RCSB
PDB	List of PDB id codes 3JCR

Gene location (Human)
Chr.	Chromosome 3 (human)
Band	3p25.1	Start	14,178,817 bp
Band	3p25.1	End	14,201,122 bp

Gene location (Mouse)
Chr.	Chromosome 6 (mouse)
Band	6|6 D1	Start	91,492,910 bp
Band	6|6 D1	End	91,499,607 bp
RNA expression pattern
Bgee	Human / Mouse (ortholog); Top expressed in: biceps brachii; Skeletal muscle tissue of biceps brachii; thoracic diaphragm; right ventricle; beta cell; oral cavity; triceps brachii muscle; mucosa of sigmoid colon; Skeletal muscle tissue of rectus abdominis; trabecular bone / Top expressed in: epiblast; embryo; embryo; blastocyst; yolk sac; ventricular zone; primary oocyte; thymus; placenta; bone marrow; More reference expression data
BioGPS	n/a
Gene ontology
Molecular function	protein binding; RNA binding
Cellular component	U6 snRNP; cytosol; Lsm1-7-Pat1 complex; catalytic step 2 spliceosome; P-body; U4/U6 x U5 tri-snRNP complex; spliceosomal complex; precatalytic spliceosome; nucleus; nucleoplasm; U2-type precatalytic spliceosome; Lsm2-8 complex
Biological process	mRNA processing; P-body assembly; exonucleolytic catabolism of deadenylated mRNA; RNA splicing; mRNA splicing, via spliceosome; nuclear-transcribed mRNA catabolic process
Sources:Amigo / QuickGO
Orthologs
Databases	NCBI: entry; OMA: entry
Species	Human	Mouse
Entrez	27258	67678
Ensembl	ENSG00000170860	ENSMUSG00000034192
UniProt	P62310	P62311
RefSeq (mRNA)	NM_014463	NM_026309
RefSeq (protein)	NP_055278	NP_080585
Location (UCSC)	Chr 3: 14.18 – 14.2 Mb	Chr 6: 91.49 – 91.5 Mb
PubMed search
- Wikidata
View/Edit Human	View/Edit Mouse

U6 snRNA-associated Sm-like protein LSm3 is a protein that in humans is encoded by the LSM3 gene.

== Function ==
Sm-like proteins were identified in a variety of organisms based on sequence homology with the Sm protein family (see SNRPD2; MIM 601061). Sm-like proteins contain the Sm sequence motif, which consists of 2 regions separated by a linker of variable length that folds as a loop. The Sm-like proteins are thought to form a stable heteromer present in tri-snRNP particles, which are important for pre-mRNA splicing.[supplied by OMIM]

== Interactions ==
LSM3 has been shown to interact with LSM2 and LSM10.
