= Galectin-1 =

Protein-coding gene in the species Homo sapiens

LGALS1
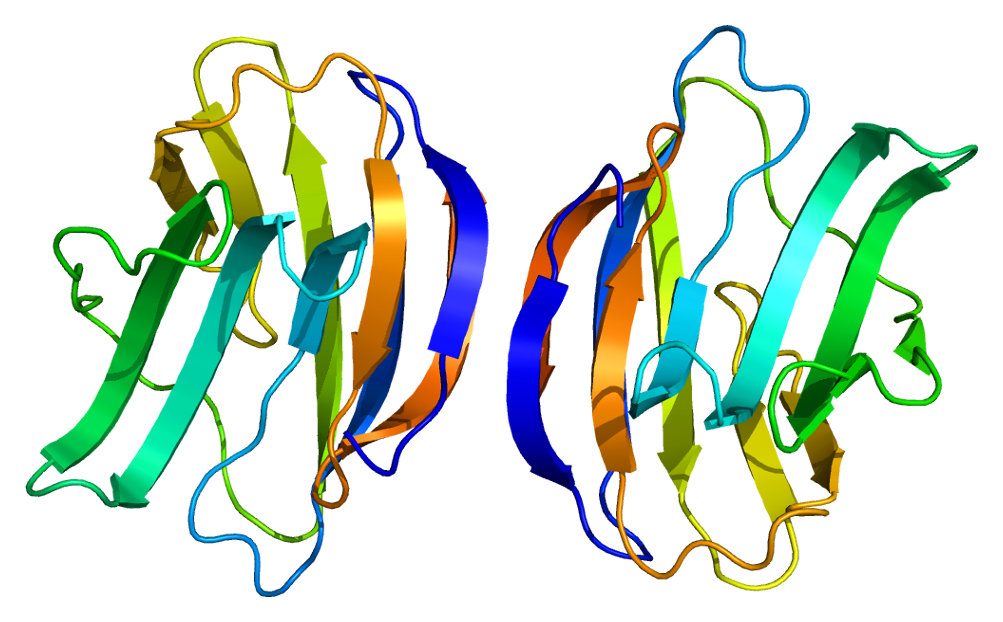

Identifiers
- Aliases: LGALS1, GAL1, GBP, galectin 1
- External IDs: OMIM: 150570; MGI: 96777; GeneCards: LGALS1
Available structures
PDB	Ortholog search: PDBe RCSB
PDB	List of PDB id codes 1GZW, 1W6M, 1W6N, 1W6O, 1W6P, 1W6Q, 2KM2, 2ZKN, 3OY8, 3OYW, 3T2T, 3W58, 3W59, 4XBL, 4Q27, 4Q1R, 4Q1P, 4Q2F, 4Q26, 4Y24, 4Y1Z, 4Y22, 4Y20, 4Y1U, 4Y1X, 4Y1Y, 4Y1V

Gene location (Human)
Chr.	Chromosome 22 (human)
Band	22q13.1	Start	37,675,636 bp
Band	22q13.1	End	37,679,802 bp

Gene location (Mouse)
Chr.	Chromosome 15 (mouse)
Band	15 E1|15 37.7 cM	Start	78,810,925 bp
Band	15 E1|15 37.7 cM	End	78,814,665 bp
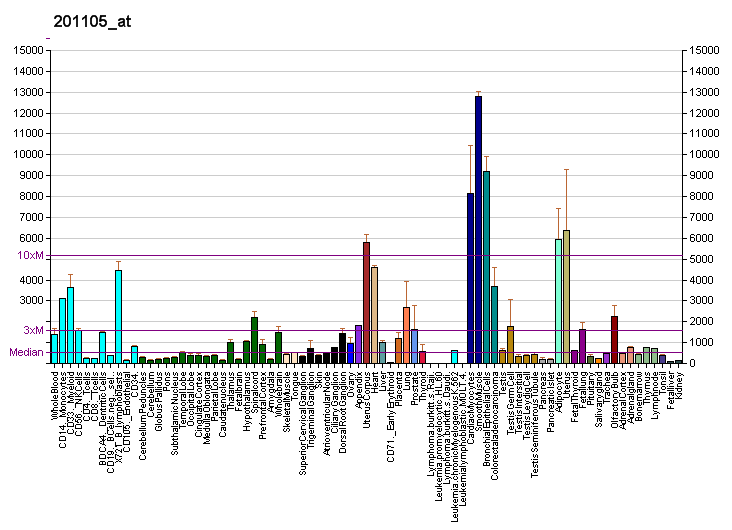
RNA expression pattern
Bgee	Human / Mouse (ortholog); Top expressed in: stromal cell of endometrium; decidua; Descending thoracic aorta; ascending aorta; spinal ganglia; periodontal fiber; body of uterus; myometrium; left coronary artery; trigeminal ganglion / Top expressed in: endothelial cell of lymphatic vessel; dermis; efferent ductule; vas deferens; internal carotid artery; calvaria; condyle; ascending aorta; external carotid artery; fossa; More reference expression data
BioGPS	More reference expression data
Gene ontology
Molecular function	protein homodimerization activity; lactose binding; signal transducer activity; laminin binding; carbohydrate binding; RNA binding; protein binding
Cellular component	cytoplasm; extracellular matrix; intracellular anatomical structure; cell surface; extracellular exosome; nucleus; extracellular space; cytosol; endoplasmic reticulum lumen; extracellular region
Biological process	negative regulation of cell-substrate adhesion; regulation of apoptotic process; negative regulation of neuron projection development; T cell costimulation; cellular response to organic cyclic compound; positive regulation of viral entry into host cell; plasma cell differentiation; positive regulation of erythrocyte aggregation; response to axon injury; positive regulation of I-kappaB kinase/NF-kappaB signaling; positive regulation of dendritic cell differentiation; myoblast differentiation; cellular response to glucose stimulus; apoptotic process; signal transduction; response to isolation stress; post-translational protein modification
Sources:Amigo / QuickGO
Orthologs
Databases	NCBI: entry; OMA: entry
Species	Human	Mouse
Entrez	3956	16852
Ensembl	ENSG00000100097	ENSMUSG00000068220
UniProt	P09382	P16045
RefSeq (mRNA)	NM_002305	NM_008495
RefSeq (protein)	NP_002296	NP_032521
Location (UCSC)	Chr 22: 37.68 – 37.68 Mb	Chr 15: 78.81 – 78.81 Mb
PubMed search
- Wikidata
View/Edit Human	View/Edit Mouse

Galectin-1 is a protein that in humans is encoded by the LGALS1 gene.

== Gene and protein ==
LGALS1 contains four exons. The galectin-1 protein is 135 amino acids in length and highly conserved across species. It can be found in the nucleus, the cytoplasm, the cell surface and in the extracellular space. Galectins in general lack a traditional signal sequence, but are still secreted across the plasma membrane. This non-traditional secretion requires a functional glycan binding site. Galectin 1 contains a single carbohydrate recognition domain through which it can bind glycans both as a monomer and as a homodimer. Dimers are non-covalently bound and will spontaneously disassociate in low concentration. Galectin 1 does not bind glycans when oxidized. Having 6 cysteine residues, the oxidation state has a significant effect on the protein structure. The oxidized form is reported to have alternative functions not involving carbohydrate binding.

== Function ==
The galectins are a family of beta-galactoside-binding proteins implicated in modulating cell-cell and cell-matrix interactions. Galectin-1 may act as an autocrine negative growth factor that regulates cell proliferation. Galectin-1 expression in Hodgkin Lymphoma has also been shown to mediate immunosuppression of CD8+ T-cells.

It has been linked to the inflammatory process in HIV individuals, and some research suggest that Gal-1 could be related to the HIV-1 latency.

== Role in pregnancy ==
Galectin-1 is thought to play a role in creating immune tolerance in pregnancy. Galectin-1 is expressed by the endometrial stromal cells throughout the menstrual cycle, however significantly increases during implantation. Galectin-1 induces the differentiation of Dendritic cells towards a phenotype which dampens T helper 1 cells and T helper 17 cells and dampens inflammation via interleukin-10 and interleukin-27. It also plays a role in the formation and expression of HLA-G in the syncytium.

== Interactions ==
LGALS1 has been shown to interact with GEMIN4 HRAS.

== See also ==
- Galectin
