= SNRPG =

Protein-coding gene in the species Homo sapiens

Identifiers
- Aliases: SNRPG, SMG, Sm-G, small nuclear ribonucleoprotein polypeptide G
- External IDs: OMIM: 603542; MGI: 1915261; GeneCards: SNRPG
Available structures
PDB	Ortholog search: PDBe RCSB
PDB	List of PDB id codes 3CW1, 3PGW, 3S6N, 4F7U, 4PJO, 4V98, 4WZJ, 3JCR

Gene location (Human)
Chr.	Chromosome 2 (human)
Band	2p13.3	Start	70,281,362 bp
Band	2p13.3	End	70,293,740 bp

Gene location (Mouse)
Chr.	Chromosome 6 (mouse)
Band	6|6 D1	Start	86,348,286 bp
Band	6|6 D1	End	86,356,310 bp
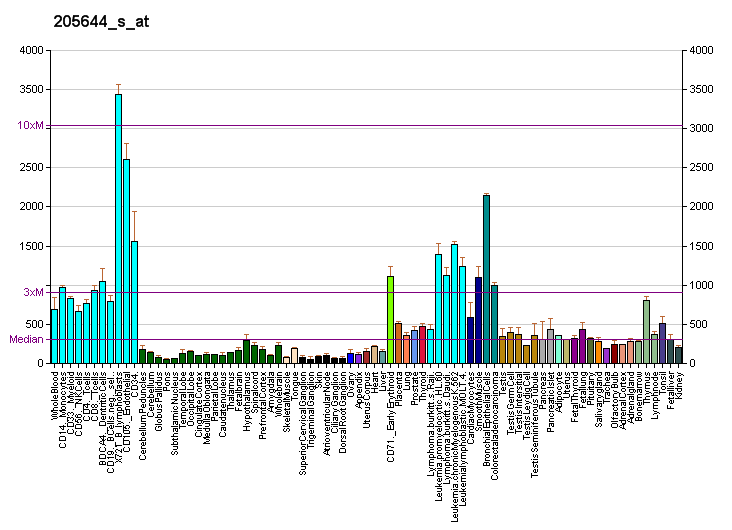
RNA expression pattern
Bgee	Human / Mouse (ortholog); Top expressed in: ganglionic eminence; ventricular zone; endometrium; placenta; mucosa of transverse colon; islet of Langerhans; right adrenal gland; left adrenal gland; left adrenal cortex; right adrenal cortex / Top expressed in: maxillary prominence; embryo; mandibular prominence; embryo; ventricular zone; epiblast; hand; somite; medial ganglionic eminence; abdominal wall; More reference expression data
BioGPS	More reference expression data
Gene ontology
Molecular function	protein binding; RNA binding
Cellular component	cytoplasm; SMN-Sm protein complex; cytosol; catalytic step 2 spliceosome; spliceosomal tri-snRNP complex; U5 snRNP; U12-type spliceosomal complex; U2 snRNP; methylosome; U7 snRNP; precatalytic spliceosome; small nuclear ribonucleoprotein complex; P granule; spliceosomal complex; U4 snRNP; U2-type prespliceosome; nucleus; nucleoplasm; U1 snRNP; U4/U6 x U5 tri-snRNP complex; U2-type precatalytic spliceosome; U2-type catalytic step 2 spliceosome
Biological process	termination of RNA polymerase II transcription; mRNA processing; spliceosomal complex assembly; RNA splicing; histone mRNA metabolic process; import into nucleus; spliceosomal snRNP assembly; mRNA splicing, via spliceosome
Sources:Amigo / QuickGO
Orthologs
Databases	NCBI: entry; OMA: entry
Species	Human	Mouse
Entrez	6637	68011
Ensembl	ENSG00000143977	ENSMUSG00000057278
UniProt	P62308; Q49AN9	P62309
RefSeq (mRNA)	NM_003096; NM_001317165; NM_001317166; NM_001317167; NM_001317168 NM_001317169; NM_001317171	NM_026506
RefSeq (protein)	NP_001304094; NP_001304095; NP_001304096; NP_001304097; NP_001304098 NP_001304100; NP_003087; NP_001304097.1; NP_001304098.1	NP_080782
Location (UCSC)	Chr 2: 70.28 – 70.29 Mb	Chr 6: 86.35 – 86.36 Mb
PubMed search
- Wikidata
View/Edit Human	View/Edit Mouse

Small nuclear ribonucleoprotein G is a protein that in humans is encoded by the SNRPG gene.

== Interactions ==
SNRPG has been shown to interact with DDX20 and TACC1.
