= Small nuclear ribonucleoprotein polypeptide E =

Protein found in humans

SNRPE

Identifiers
- Aliases: SNRPE, B-raf, HYPT11, SME, Sm-E, Small nuclear ribonucleoprotein polypeptide E, snRNP-E
- External IDs: OMIM: 128260; MGI: 3650419; GeneCards: SNRPE
Available structures
PDB	Human UniProt search: PDBe RCSB
PDB	List of PDB id codes 3CW1, 3PGW, 3S6N, 4F7U, 4PJO, 4V98, 4WZJ, 3JCR

Gene location (Human)
Chr.	Chromosome 1 (human)
Band	1q32.1	Start	203,861,599 bp
Band	1q32.1	End	203,871,152 bp
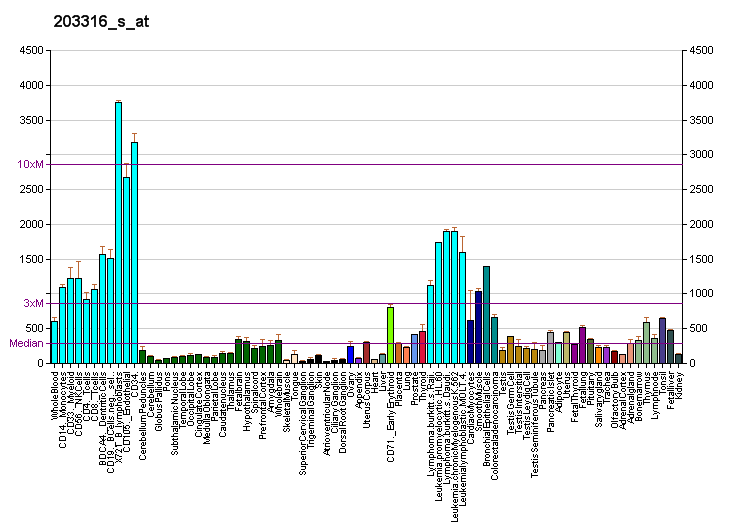
RNA expression pattern
Bgee	Human / Mouse (ortholog); Top expressed in: ganglionic eminence; ventricular zone; left ovary; right ovary; olfactory zone of nasal mucosa; body of pancreas; canal of the cervix; ectocervix; body of uterus; mucosa of transverse colon / n/a; More reference expression data
BioGPS	More reference expression data
Gene ontology
Molecular function	protein binding; RNA binding
Cellular component	cytoplasm; SMN-Sm protein complex; cytosol; catalytic step 2 spliceosome; U12-type spliceosomal complex; nucleoplasm; methylosome; U7 snRNP; small nuclear ribonucleoprotein complex; pICln-Sm protein complex; telomerase holoenzyme complex; spliceosomal complex; U4 snRNP; nucleus; U5 snRNP; U2 snRNP; U4/U6 x U5 tri-snRNP complex; precatalytic spliceosome; U1 snRNP; U2-type catalytic step 2 spliceosome; U2-type precatalytic spliceosome
Biological process	hair cycle; mRNA splicing, via spliceosome; termination of RNA polymerase II transcription; mRNA processing; spliceosomal snRNP assembly; spliceosomal complex assembly; histone mRNA metabolic process; import into nucleus; RNA splicing
Sources:Amigo / QuickGO
Orthologs
Databases	NCBI: entry; OMA: entry
Species	Human	Mouse
Entrez	6635	102632439
Ensembl	ENSG00000182004	n/a
UniProt	P62304	n/a
RefSeq (mRNA)	NM_001304464; NM_003094; NM_001328637; NM_001328638	n/a
RefSeq (protein)	NP_001291393; NP_001315566; NP_001315567; NP_003085	n/a
Location (UCSC)	Chr 1: 203.86 – 203.87 Mb	n/a
PubMed search
- Wikidata
View/Edit Human	View/Edit Mouse

Small nuclear ribonucleoprotein E is a protein that in humans is encoded by the SNRPE gene.

== Interactions ==
Small nuclear ribonucleoprotein polypeptide E has been shown to interact with DDX20 and Small nuclear ribonucleoprotein polypeptide F.
