= TACC1 =

Protein-coding gene in the species Homo sapiens

Identifiers
- Aliases: TACC1, Ga55, transforming acidic coiled-coil containing protein 1
- External IDs: OMIM: 605301; MGI: 2443510; HomoloGene: 4575; GeneCards: TACC1; OMA:TACC1 - orthologs

Gene location (Mouse)
Chr.	Chromosome 8 (mouse)
Band	8|8 A2	Start	25,644,568 bp
Band	8|8 A2	End	25,746,604 bp
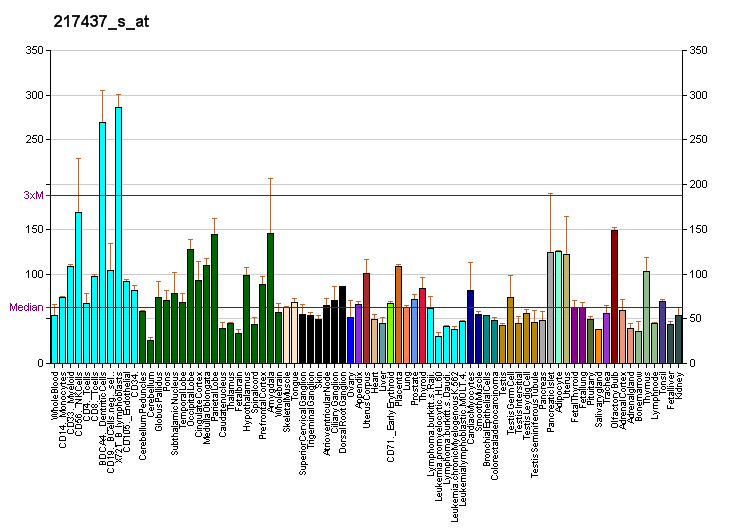

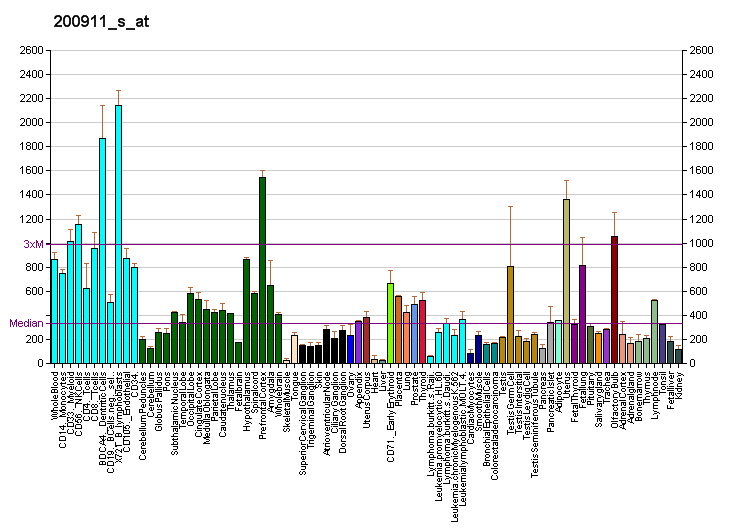
RNA expression pattern
Bgee	Human / Mouse (ortholog); n/a / Top expressed in: gastrula; otolith organ; utricle; decidua; uterus; dorsal striatum; brown adipose tissue; nucleus accumbens; adrenal gland; prefrontal cortex
BioGPS	More reference expression data
Gene ontology
Molecular function	protein binding; nuclear receptor binding; estrogen receptor binding; glucocorticoid receptor binding; retinoic acid receptor binding; peroxisome proliferator activated receptor binding; retinoid X receptor binding; thyroid hormone receptor binding
Cellular component	midbody; cytoskeleton; membrane; nucleus; microtubule organizing center; cytoplasm; microtubule cytoskeleton
Biological process	cerebral cortex development; cell division; cell cycle; cell population proliferation; microtubule cytoskeleton organization; mitotic spindle organization
Sources:Amigo / QuickGO
Orthologs
Species	Human	Mouse
Entrez	6867	320165
Ensembl	ENSG00000147526	ENSMUSG00000065954
UniProt	O75410	Q6Y685
RefSeq (mRNA)	NM_001122824; NM_001146216; NM_006283; NM_001330521	NM_177089; NM_199323
RefSeq (protein)	NP_001116296; NP_001139688; NP_001317450; NP_006274; NP_001339707 NP_001339708; NP_001339709; NP_001339710; NP_001339711; NP_001339712; NP_001339713; NP_001339714; NP_001339715; NP_001339716; NP_001339717; NP_001339718; NP_001339719; NP_001339720; NP_001339721; NP_001339722; NP_001339723; NP_001339724; NP_001339725; NP_001339726; NP_001339727; NP_001339728; NP_001339729; NP_001339730; NP_001339731; NP_001339732; NP_001339733	NP_796063; NP_955355; NP_001389770; NP_001389771; NP_001389772
Location (UCSC)	n/a	Chr 8: 25.64 – 25.75 Mb
PubMed search
- Wikidata
View/Edit Human	View/Edit Mouse

Transforming acidic coiled-coil-containing protein 1 is a protein that in humans is encoded by the TACC1 gene.

== Function ==
The function of this gene has not yet been determined; however, it is speculated that it may represent a breast cancer candidate gene. It is located close to FGFR1 on a region of chromosome 8 that is amplified in some breast cancers.

== Interactions ==
TACC1 has been shown to interact with:

- Aurora A kinase,
- Aurora B kinase,
- BARD1,
- CKAP5,
- LSM7,
- SNRPG, and
- TDRD7.
