= LSM2 =

Protein-coding gene in the species Homo sapiens

Identifiers
- Aliases: LSM2, C6orf28, G7B, YBL026W, snRNP, LSM2 homolog, U6 small nuclear RNA and mRNA degradation associated
- External IDs: OMIM: 607282; MGI: 90676; GeneCards: LSM2
Available structures
PDB	Ortholog search: PDBe RCSB
PDB	List of PDB id codes 3JCR

Gene location (Human)
Chr.	Chromosome 6 (human)
Band	6p21.33	Start	31,797,396 bp
Band	6p21.33	End	31,806,966 bp

Gene location (Mouse)
Chr.	Chromosome 17 (mouse)
Band	17 B1|17 18.52 cM	Start	35,200,838 bp
Band	17 B1|17 18.52 cM	End	35,204,867 bp
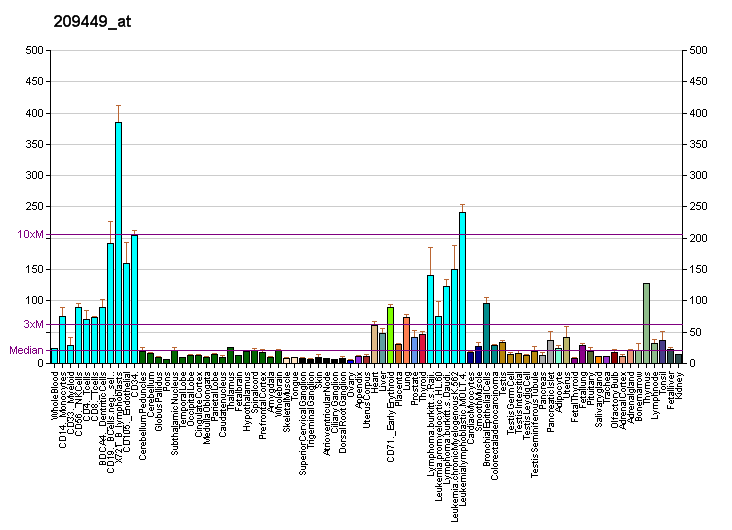
RNA expression pattern
Bgee	Human / Mouse (ortholog); Top expressed in: ventricular zone; ganglionic eminence; gonad; mucosa of transverse colon; body of uterus; canal of the cervix; myometrium; left uterine tube; muscle layer of sigmoid colon; ectocervix / Top expressed in: genital tubercle; tail of embryo; yolk sac; embryo; embryo; spermatocyte; spermatid; epiblast; seminiferous tubule; ventricular zone; More reference expression data
BioGPS	More reference expression data
Gene ontology
Molecular function	protein binding; U6 snRNA binding; RNA binding
Cellular component	cytosol; U4/U6 x U5 tri-snRNP complex; catalytic step 2 spliceosome; U6 snRNP; P-body; nucleoplasm; Lsm1-7-Pat1 complex; precatalytic spliceosome; spliceosomal complex; nucleus; U2-type precatalytic spliceosome; Lsm2-8 complex
Biological process	mRNA splicing, via spliceosome; mRNA processing; exonucleolytic catabolism of deadenylated mRNA; RNA splicing
Sources:Amigo / QuickGO
Orthologs
Databases	NCBI: entry; OMA: entry
Species	Human	Mouse
Entrez	57819	27756
Ensembl	ENSG00000204392	ENSMUSG00000007050
UniProt	Q9Y333	O35900
RefSeq (mRNA)	NM_021177	NM_001110101; NM_001204273; NM_001204274; NM_030597
RefSeq (protein)	NP_067000	NP_001103571; NP_001191202; NP_001191203; NP_085100
Location (UCSC)	Chr 6: 31.8 – 31.81 Mb	Chr 17: 35.2 – 35.2 Mb
PubMed search
- Wikidata
View/Edit Human	View/Edit Mouse

U6 snRNA-associated Sm-like protein LSm2 is a protein that in humans is encoded by the LSM2 gene.

== Function ==
Sm-like proteins were identified in a variety of organisms based on sequence homology with the Sm protein family (see SNRPD2; MIM 601061). Sm-like proteins contain the Sm sequence motif, which consists of 2 regions separated by a linker of variable length that folds as a loop. The Sm-like proteins are thought to form a stable heteromer present in tri-snRNP particles, which are important for pre-mRNA splicing.[supplied by OMIM]

== Interactions ==
LSM2 has been shown to interact with DDX20, LSM3, LSM8 and LSM7.
