= LSM10 =

Protein-coding gene in humans

Identifiers
- Aliases: LSM10, MST074, MSTP074, U7 small nuclear RNA associated
- External IDs: OMIM: 617909; MGI: 2151045; GeneCards: LSM10

Gene location (Human)
Chr.	Chromosome 1 (human)
Band	1p34.3	Start	36,391,238 bp
Band	1p34.3	End	36,397,908 bp

Gene location (Mouse)
Chr.	Chromosome 4 (mouse)
Band	4|4 D2.2	Start	125,990,416 bp
Band	4|4 D2.2	End	125,992,377 bp
RNA expression pattern
Bgee	Human / Mouse (ortholog); Top expressed in: muscle of thigh; gastrocnemius muscle; granulocyte; apex of heart; monocyte; right auricle of heart; skeletal muscle tissue; tibialis anterior muscle; quadriceps femoris muscle; muscle layer of sigmoid colon / Top expressed in: interventricular septum; primary oocyte; granulocyte; endocardial cushion; yolk sac; right kidney; medial ganglionic eminence; left lobe of liver; embryo; embryo; More reference expression data
BioGPS	n/a
Gene ontology
Molecular function	U7 snRNA binding; protein binding; histone pre-mRNA DCP binding; RNA binding
Cellular component	Cajal body; U7 snRNP; nucleus; nucleoplasm; nuclear body
Biological process	positive regulation of G1/S transition of mitotic cell cycle; termination of RNA polymerase II transcription; mRNA processing; histone mRNA metabolic process; RNA splicing
Sources:Amigo / QuickGO
Orthologs
Databases	NCBI: entry; OMA: entry
Species	Human	Mouse
Entrez	84967	116748
Ensembl	ENSG00000181817	ENSMUSG00000050188
UniProt	Q969L4	Q8QZX5
RefSeq (mRNA)	NM_032881	NM_001163266; NM_138721
RefSeq (protein)	NP_116270	NP_001156738; NP_620046
Location (UCSC)	Chr 1: 36.39 – 36.4 Mb	Chr 4: 125.99 – 125.99 Mb
PubMed search
- Wikidata
View/Edit Human	View/Edit Mouse

U7 snRNA-associated Sm-like protein LSm10 is a protein that in humans is encoded by the LSM10 gene.

== Interactions ==
LSM10 has been shown to interact with LSM3.

== See also ==
- U7 small nuclear RNA
