= TDRD7 =

Protein-coding gene in the species Homo sapiens

Identifiers
- Aliases: TDRD7, CATC4, CTRCT36, PCTAIRE2BP, TRAP, tudor domain containing 7
- External IDs: OMIM: 611258; MGI: 2140279; GeneCards: TDRD7
Available structures
PDB	Ortholog search: PDBe RCSB
PDB	List of PDB id codes 3RCO

Gene location (Human)
Chr.	Chromosome 9 (human)
Band	9q22.33	Start	97,412,096 bp
Band	9q22.33	End	97,496,125 bp

Gene location (Mouse)
Chr.	Chromosome 4 (mouse)
Band	4|4 B1	Start	45,965,334 bp
Band	4|4 B1	End	46,034,761 bp
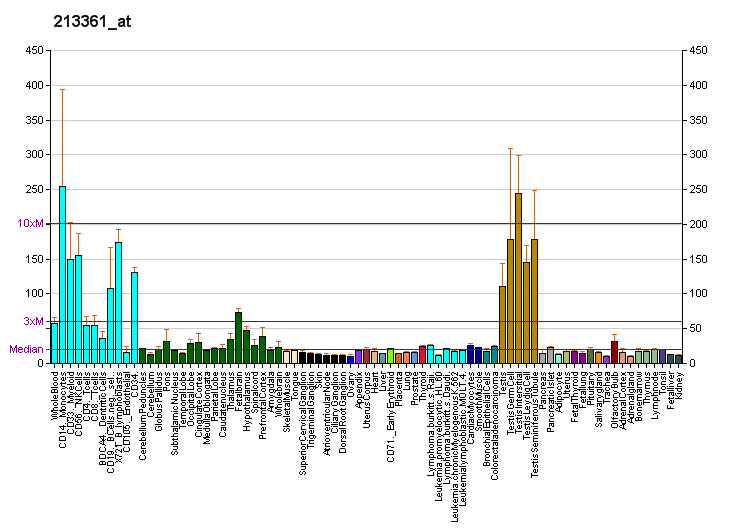
RNA expression pattern
Bgee	Human / Mouse (ortholog); Top expressed in: secondary oocyte; jejunal mucosa; retinal pigment epithelium; internal globus pallidus; sperm; pars reticulata; monocyte; duodenum; testicle; middle frontal gyrus / Top expressed in: epithelium of lens; spermatid; neural layer of retina; seminiferous tubule; spermatocyte; retinal pigment epithelium; granulocyte; mucous cell of stomach; intestinal villus; jejunum; More reference expression data
BioGPS	More reference expression data
Gene ontology
Molecular function	mRNA binding; protein binding; protein N-terminus binding; RNA binding
Cellular component	cytoplasm; chromatoid body; mitochondrial matrix; ribonucleoprotein granule
Biological process	posttranscriptional regulation of gene expression; cell differentiation; lens fiber cell differentiation; lens morphogenesis in camera-type eye; spermatogenesis
Sources:Amigo / QuickGO
Orthologs
Databases	NCBI: entry; OMA: entry
Species	Human	Mouse
Entrez	23424	100121
Ensembl	ENSG00000196116	ENSMUSG00000035517
UniProt	Q8NHU6	Q8K1H1
RefSeq (mRNA)	NM_001302884; NM_014290	NM_001290475; NM_146142; NM_001355189
RefSeq (protein)	NP_001289813; NP_055105	NP_001277404; NP_666254; NP_001342118
Location (UCSC)	Chr 9: 97.41 – 97.5 Mb	Chr 4: 45.97 – 46.03 Mb
PubMed search
- Wikidata
View/Edit Human	View/Edit Mouse

Tudor domain-containing protein 7 is a protein that in humans is encoded by the TDRD7 gene.

In melanocytic cells TDRD7 gene expression may be regulated by MITF.

== Gene polymorphism ==
Various single nucleotide polymorphisms (SNPs) of the TDRD7 gene have been identified and for some of them an association with lower susceptibility to age-related cataract was shown.

== Interactions ==
TDRD7 has been shown to interact with TACC1.
