= TNRC6B =

Protein-coding gene in the species Homo sapiens

Identifiers
- Aliases: TNRC6B, trinucleotide repeat containing 6B, trinucleotide repeat containing adaptor 6B, GDSBA
- External IDs: OMIM: 610740; MGI: 2443730; GeneCards: TNRC6B

Gene location (Human)
Chr.	Chromosome 22 (human)
Band	22q13.1	Start	40,044,817 bp
Band	22q13.1	End	40,335,808 bp

Gene location (Mouse)
Chr.	Chromosome 15 (mouse)
Band	15|15 E1	Start	80,595,514 bp
Band	15|15 E1	End	80,825,286 bp
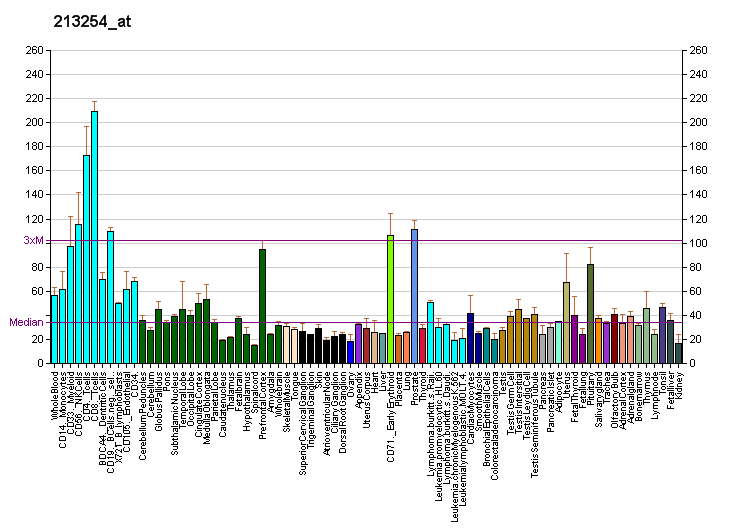
RNA expression pattern
Bgee	Human / Mouse (ortholog); Top expressed in: buccal mucosa cell; epithelium of nasopharynx; sural nerve; oocyte; caput epididymis; trabecular bone; secondary oocyte; seminal vesicula; nipple; tail of epididymis / Top expressed in: zygote; secondary oocyte; granulocyte; genital tubercle; tibiofemoral joint; tail of embryo; neural layer of retina; human fetus; lens; inferior colliculi; More reference expression data
BioGPS	More reference expression data
Gene ontology
Molecular function	protein binding; nucleic acid binding; RNA binding
Cellular component	cytoplasm; cytosol; P-body; nucleoplasm
Biological process	RNA interference; positive regulation of nuclear-transcribed mRNA poly(A) tail shortening; regulation of translation; positive regulation of nuclear-transcribed mRNA catabolic process, deadenylation-dependent decay; gene silencing; miRNA-mediated gene silencing by inhibition of translation; Wnt signaling pathway, calcium modulating pathway; regulation of megakaryocyte differentiation; positive regulation of gene expression; negative regulation of gene expression; gene silencing by miRNA
Sources:Amigo / QuickGO
Orthologs
Databases	NCBI: entry; OMA: entry
Species	Human	Mouse
Entrez	23112	213988
Ensembl	ENSG00000100354	ENSMUSG00000047888
UniProt	Q9UPQ9	Q8BKI2
RefSeq (mRNA)	NM_015088; NM_001024843; NM_001162501	NM_144812; NM_177124
RefSeq (protein)	NP_001020014; NP_001155973; NP_055903	NP_659061; NP_796098
Location (UCSC)	Chr 22: 40.04 – 40.34 Mb	Chr 15: 80.6 – 80.83 Mb
PubMed search
- Wikidata
View/Edit Human	View/Edit Mouse

Trinucleotide repeat-containing gene 6B protein is a protein that in humans is encoded by the TNRC6B gene.

== Interactions ==
TNRC6B has been shown to interact with EIF2C2. It is also known to associate with argonaute proteins and has been shown to be required for miRNA-guided gene silencing in HeLa cells.
