= LSM8 =

Protein-coding gene in the species Homo sapiens

Identifiers
- Aliases: LSM8, NAA38, LSM8 homolog, U6 small nuclear RNA associated
- External IDs: OMIM: 607288; MGI: 1923772; GeneCards: LSM8
Available structures
PDB	Ortholog search: PDBe RCSB
PDB	List of PDB id codes 3JCR

Gene location (Human)
Chr.	Chromosome 7 (human)
Band	7q31.31	Start	118,184,144 bp
Band	7q31.31	End	118,204,035 bp

Gene location (Mouse)
Chr.	Chromosome 6 (mouse)
Band	6|6 A2	Start	18,848,578 bp
Band	6|6 A2	End	18,855,750 bp
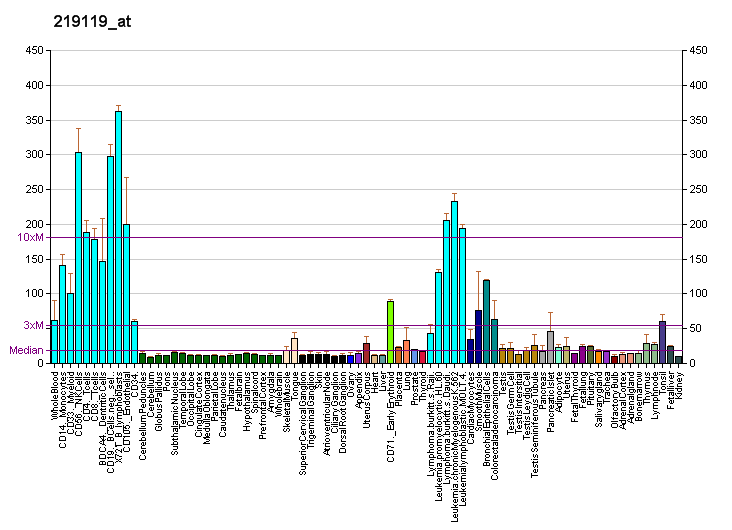
RNA expression pattern
Bgee	Human / Mouse (ortholog); Top expressed in: Achilles tendon; epithelium of colon; right ventricle; ventricular zone; monocyte; bone marrow; bone marrow cell; skin of thigh; granulocyte; oocyte / Top expressed in: primitive streak; abdominal wall; medial ganglionic eminence; hair follicle; vas deferens; embryo; migratory enteric neural crest cell; mandibular prominence; Gonadal ridge; embryo; More reference expression data
BioGPS	More reference expression data
Gene ontology
Molecular function	protein binding; U6 snRNA binding; RNA binding
Cellular component	spliceosomal complex; nucleus; nucleoplasm; U4/U6 x U5 tri-snRNP complex; U6 snRNP; precatalytic spliceosome; U2-type precatalytic spliceosome; Lsm2-8 complex
Biological process	mRNA processing; RNA splicing; mRNA splicing, via spliceosome; RNA metabolic process
Sources:Amigo / QuickGO
Orthologs
Databases	NCBI: entry; OMA: entry
Species	Human	Mouse
Entrez	51691	76522
Ensembl	ENSG00000128534	ENSMUSG00000044155
UniProt	O95777	Q6ZWM4
RefSeq (mRNA)	NM_016200	NM_133939
RefSeq (protein)	NP_057284	NP_598700
Location (UCSC)	Chr 7: 118.18 – 118.2 Mb	Chr 6: 18.85 – 18.86 Mb
PubMed search
- Wikidata
View/Edit Human	View/Edit Mouse

U6 snRNA-associated Sm-like protein LSm8 is a protein that in humans is encoded by the LSM8 gene.

This gene is a member of the LSm family and encodes a protein with a closed barrel shape, made up of five anti-parallel beta strands and an alpha helix. The protein partners with six paralogs to form a heteroheptameric ring which transiently binds RNAs and is involved in the general maturation of RNA in the nucleus.

== Interactions ==
LSM8 has been shown to interact with LSM2.
