= RA33 =

Autoantigen

RA33, also known as heterogeneous nuclear ribonucleoprotein A2/B1, is an autoantigen in human systemic autoimmune diseases.

In 1989, a novel class of autoantibodies was detected in sera of patients with rheumatoid arthritis (RA), which were directed against a protein with an estimated molecular mass of 33 kDa in nuclear extracts from HeLa cells. The antigen was therefore named RA33. Protein sequencing of highly purified RA33 revealed that it was identical to hetergoneous nuclear ribonucleoprotein A2/B1 (hnRPA2B1). Nowadays, the name anti-RA33 defines autoantibodies that are directed against hnRNP A2 and its splice variant hnRNP B1. Anti-RA33 occur in approximately 15-35% of patients with RA, in 20-25% of patients with systemic lupus erythematosus and in 35-40% of patients with mixed connective tissue disease, being rare or absent in other forms of arthritis. Anti-RA33 antibodies can be easily detected by immunoblotting employing crude nuclear extracts or the recombinant antigen. ELISA can also be employed which has been found to be less sensitive than immunoblotting.

The pathogenic role of anti-RA33 antibodies is not fully understood. Anti-RA33 antibodies and T cells directed against RA33 might contribute to autoimmunity and inflammation by immune complex formation or by virtue of secretion of cytokines that may initiate and drive the pathogenic process. Of note, anti-RA33 are detectable already in the earliest disease stage of RA or even years before the onset of actual clinical disease. However, anti-RA33 antibodies are not associated with significant bone erosions or disease activity. In the absence of rheumatoid factor and anti-citrullinated protein antibody they are associated with a milder disease in RA.
