= EIF2C2 =

Protein-coding gene in the species Homo sapiens

AGO2
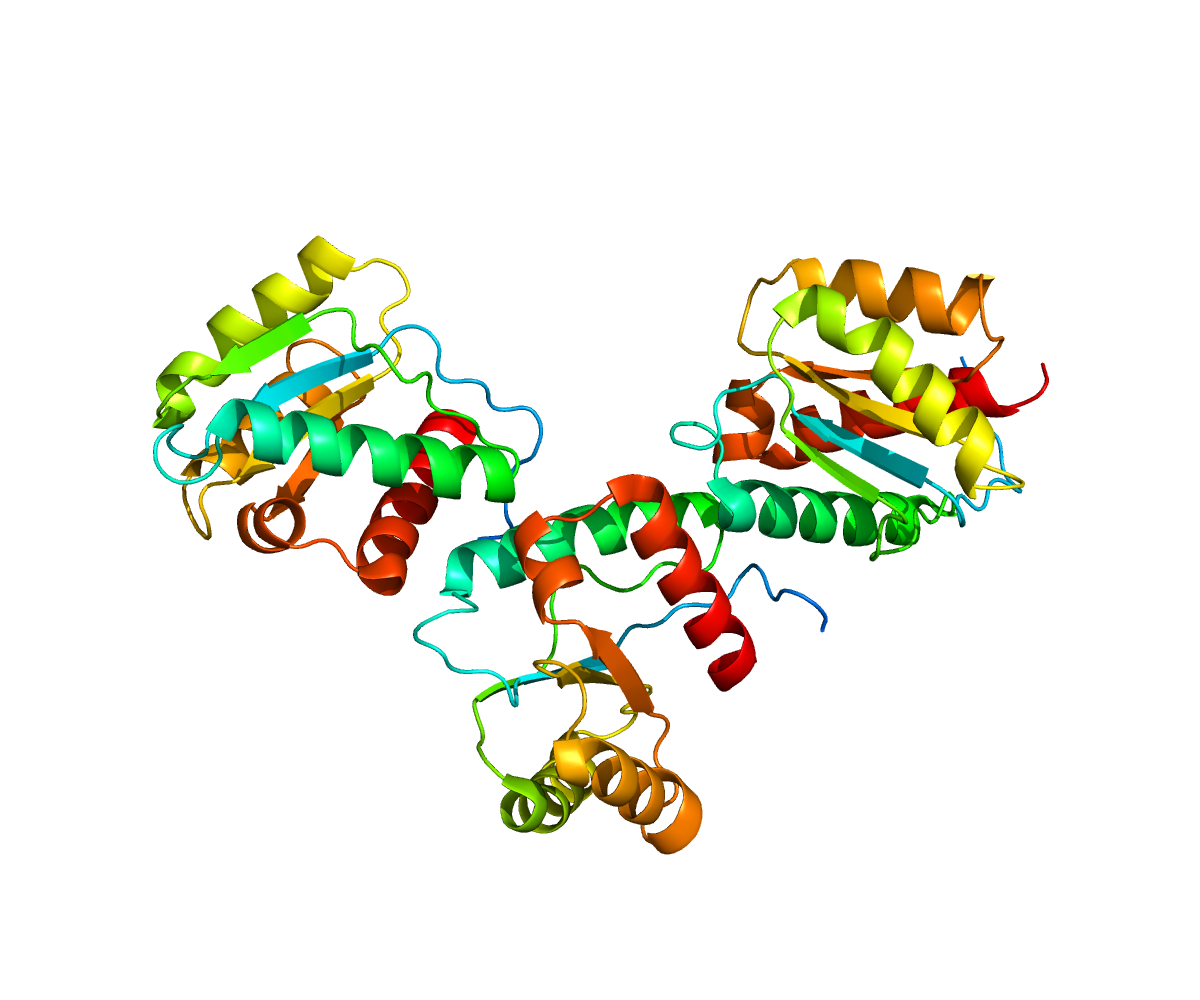
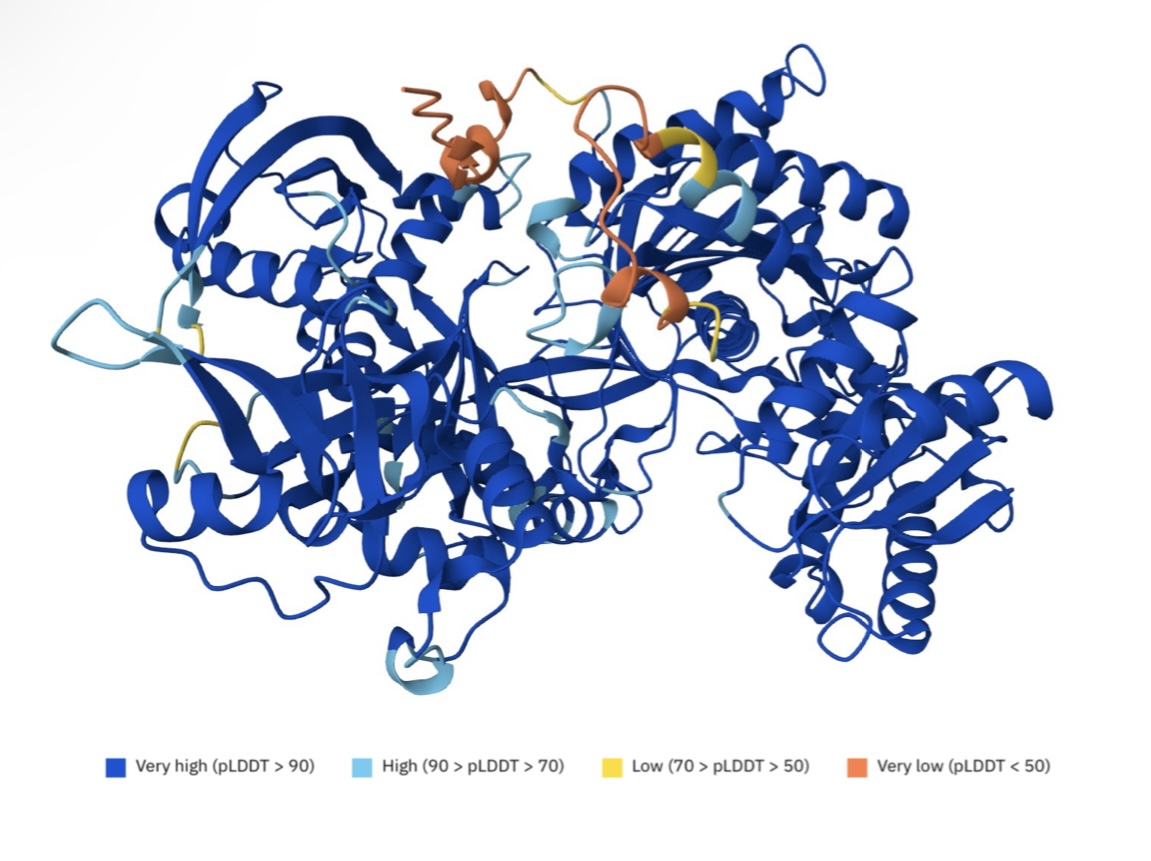
Available structures
| PDB | Ortholog search: PDBe RCSB |
| PDB | List of PDB id codes 3LUC, 3LUD, 3LUG, 3LUH, 3LUJ, 3LUK, 3QX8, 3QX9, 4F3T, 4OLA, 4OLB, 4W5N, 4W5O, 4W5Q, 4W5R, 4W5T, 4Z4C, 4Z4D, 4Z4E, 4Z4F, 4Z4G, 4Z4H, 4Z4I, 5JS1, 5JS2 |

Identifiers
- Aliases: AGO2, EIF2C2, Q10, argonaute 2, RISC catalytic component, PPD, CASC7, LINC00980, argonaute RISC catalytic component 2, LESKRES
- External IDs: OMIM: 606229; MGI: 2446632; HomoloGene: 81825; GeneCards: AGO2; OMA:AGO2 - orthologs

Gene location (Human)
| Chr. | Chromosome 8 (human) |
| Band | 8q24.3 | Start | 140,520,156 bp |
| Band | 8q24.3 | End | 140,635,633 bp |

Gene location (Mouse)
| Chr. | Chromosome 15 (mouse) |
| Band | 15|15 D3 | Start | 72,967,693 bp |
| Band | 15|15 D3 | End | 73,056,784 bp |
RNA expression pattern
| Bgee | Human / Mouse (ortholog); Top expressed in: epithelium of colon; cartilage tissue; tail of epididymis; superficial temporal artery; trabecular bone; corpus epididymis; mucosa of paranasal sinus; lower lobe of lung; tendon; Achilles tendon / Top expressed in: ascending aorta; hand; aortic valve; human fetus; supraoptic nucleus; ventromedial nucleus; anterior amygdaloid area; suprachiasmatic nucleus; foot; paraventricular nucleus of hypothalamus; More reference expression data |
| BioGPS | n/a |
Gene ontology
| Molecular function | protein binding; protein C-terminus binding; metal ion binding; nuclease activity; endoribonuclease activity, cleaving miRNA-paired mRNA; hydrolase activity; translation initiation factor activity; endonuclease activity; endoribonuclease activity, cleaving siRNA-paired mRNA; single-stranded RNA binding; double-stranded RNA binding; RNA polymerase II complex binding; nucleic acid binding; mRNA binding; miRNA binding; endoribonuclease activity; RNA 7-methylguanosine cap binding; siRNA binding; mRNA cap binding; RNA binding; endoribonuclease activity, producing 5'-phosphomonoesters |
| Cellular component | cytoplasm; polysome; membrane; P-body; dendrite; RISC-loading complex; RISC complex; cytosol; nucleus; nucleoplasm; mRNA cap binding complex; cell junction; extracellular exosome; ribonucleoprotein complex |
| Biological process | mRNA destabilization-mediated gene silencing by miRNA; RNA secondary structure unwinding; transcription, DNA-templated; regulation of translation; RNA interference; protein biosynthesis; positive regulation of nuclear-transcribed mRNA catabolic process, deadenylation-dependent decay; positive regulation of gene expression; production of miRNAs involved in gene silencing by miRNA; mRNA destabilization-mediated gene silencing by siRNA; positive regulation of nuclear-transcribed mRNA poly(A) tail shortening; pre-miRNA processing; regulation of transcription, DNA-templated; positive regulation of transcription by RNA polymerase II; post-embryonic development; RNA phosphodiester bond hydrolysis, endonucleolytic; translational initiation; Wnt signaling pathway, calcium modulating pathway; miRNA-mediated gene silencing by inhibition of translation; negative regulation of translational initiation; miRNA metabolic process; production of siRNA involved in RNA interference; gene silencing; regulation of gene silencing by miRNA; negative regulation of gene expression; positive regulation of angiogenesis; positive regulation of trophoblast cell migration; negative regulation of amyloid precursor protein biosynthetic process |
Sources:Amigo / QuickGO
Orthologs
| Species | Human | Mouse |
| Entrez | 27161 | 239528 |
| Ensembl | ENSG00000123908 | ENSMUSG00000036698 |
| UniProt | Q9UKV8 | Q8CJG0 |
| RefSeq (mRNA) | NM_001164623; NM_012154 | NM_153178 |
| RefSeq (protein) | NP_001158095; NP_036286 | NP_694818 |
| Location (UCSC) | Chr 8: 140.52 – 140.64 Mb | Chr 15: 72.97 – 73.06 Mb |
| PubMed search |
- Wikidata
| View/Edit Human | View/Edit Mouse |

Protein argonaute-2 is a protein that in humans is encoded by the EIF2C2 gene.

This gene encodes a member of the Argonaute family of proteins which play a role in RNA interference. The encoded protein is highly basic, and contains a PAZ domain and a PIWI domain. It may interact with Dicer1 and play a role in short-interfering-RNA-mediated gene silencing.

== Interactions ==
EIF2C2 has been shown to interact with

- DDX20,
- DICER1,
- FMRP, FXR1P, FXR2P, and
- TNRC6B.
