= DDX20 =

Protein-coding gene in humans

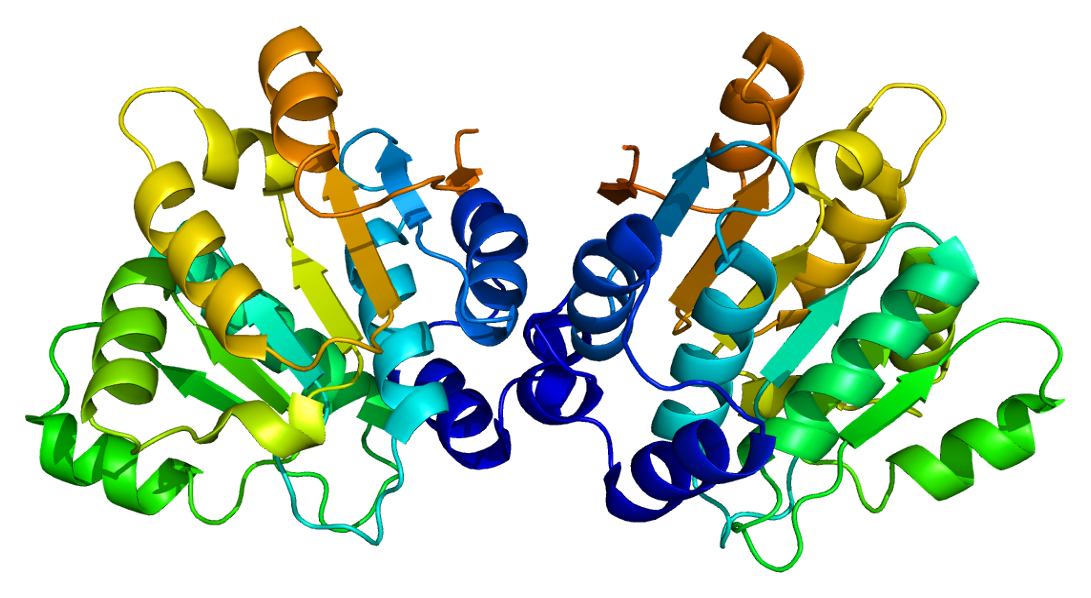

Identifiers
- Aliases: DDX20, DP103, GEMIN3, DEAD-box helicase 20
- External IDs: OMIM: 606168; MGI: 1858415; GeneCards: DDX20
Available structures
PDB	Ortholog search: PDBe RCSB
PDB	List of PDB id codes 2OXC, 3B7G
Enzyme activity
EC #	BRENDA	ExPASy	KEGG	MetaCyc
3.6.1.15	↗	↗	↗	↗
3.6.4.13	↗	↗	↗	↗

Gene location (Human)
Chr.	Chromosome 1 (human)
Band	1p13.2	Start	111,754,832 bp
Band	1p13.2	End	111,775,602 bp

Gene location (Mouse)
Chr.	Chromosome 3 (mouse)
Band	3|3 F2.2	Start	105,585,586 bp
Band	3|3 F2.2	End	105,594,890 bp
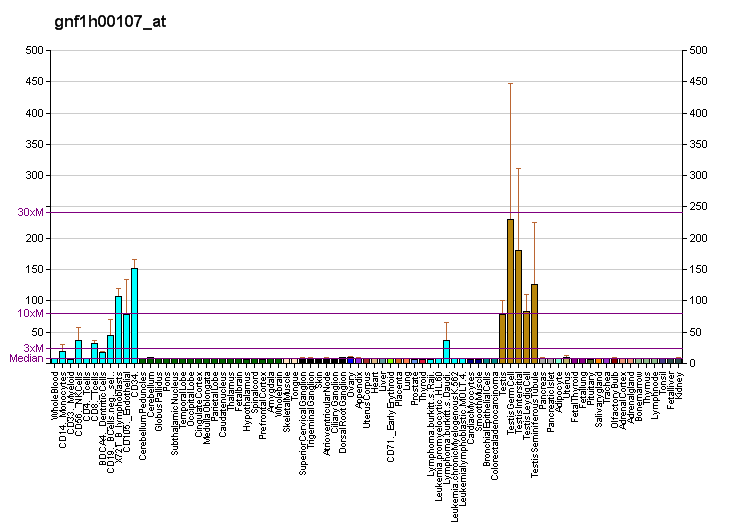
RNA expression pattern
Bgee	Human / Mouse (ortholog); Top expressed in: sperm; left testis; right testis; tibialis anterior muscle; secondary oocyte; testicle; gonad; pancreatic epithelial cell; mucosa of ileum; deltoid muscle / Top expressed in: otic placode; otic vesicle; saccule; spermatid; seminiferous tubule; spermatocyte; epiblast; genital tubercle; maxillary prominence; mandibular prominence; More reference expression data
BioGPS	More reference expression data
Gene ontology
Molecular function	DNA binding; protein-macromolecule adaptor activity; nucleotide binding; helicase activity; protein domain specific binding; histone deacetylase binding; protein binding; nucleic acid binding; hydrolase activity; ATP binding
Cellular component	SMN-Sm protein complex; cytosol; membrane; transcription repressor complex; nucleoplasm; SMN complex; RNA polymerase II transcription repressor complex; cytoskeleton; nucleus; gemini of coiled bodies; cytoplasm; nuclear body; nucleolus
Biological process	RNA processing; spliceosomal tri-snRNP complex assembly; mRNA processing; regulation of steroid biosynthetic process; negative regulation of transcription by RNA polymerase II; oogenesis; spliceosomal snRNP assembly; RNA secondary structure unwinding; RNA splicing; positive regulation of apoptotic process; negative regulation of transcription, DNA-templated; negative regulation of cell population proliferation; import into nucleus
Sources:Amigo / QuickGO
Orthologs
Databases	NCBI: entry; OMA: entry
Species	Human	Mouse
Entrez	11218	53975
Ensembl	ENSG00000064703	ENSMUSG00000027905
UniProt	Q9UHI6	Q9JJY4
RefSeq (mRNA)	NM_007204	NM_017397
RefSeq (protein)	NP_009135	NP_059093
Location (UCSC)	Chr 1: 111.75 – 111.78 Mb	Chr 3: 105.59 – 105.59 Mb
PubMed search
- Wikidata
View/Edit Human	View/Edit Mouse

Probable ATP-dependent RNA helicase DDX20, also known as DEAD-box helicase 20 and gem-associated protein 3 (GEMIN3), is an enzyme that in humans is encoded by the DDX20 gene.

== Function ==
DEAD box proteins, characterized by the conserved motif Asp-Glu-Ala-Asp (DEAD), are putative RNA helicases. They are implicated in a number of cellular processes involving alteration of RNA secondary structure such as translation initiation, nuclear and mitochondrial splicing, and ribosome and spliceosome assembly. Based on their distribution patterns, some members of this family are believed to be involved in embryogenesis, spermatogenesis, and cellular growth and division. This gene encodes a DEAD box protein, which has an ATPase activity and is a component of the survival of motor neuron (SMN) complex. SMN is the spinal muscular atrophy gene product, and may play a catalytic role in the function of the SMN complex on RNPs.

== Clinical significance ==
Previous research has revealed that DDX20 may act as a tumor suppressor in hepatocellular carcinoma and as a tumor promoter in breast cancer. DDX20 deficiency enhances NF-κB activity by impairing the NF-κB-suppressive action of microRNAs, and suggest that dysregulation of the microRNA machinery components may also be involved in pathogenesis in various human diseases. Such as miRNA-140 which acts as a liver tumor suppressor, and due to a deficiency of DDX20, miRNA-140 function gets impair, this subsequent functional impairment of miRNAs could lead to hepatocarcinogenesis. Similarly, DDX20 may promote the progression of prostate cancer through the NF-κB pathway. In a clinical based study it has been observed that positive DP103/NF-κB feedback loop promotes constitutive NF-κB activation in invasive breast cancers and activation of this pathway is linked to cancer progression and the acquisition of chemotherapy resistance. It makes DP103 has potential as a therapeutic target for breast cancer treatment.

== Interactions ==
DDX20 has been shown to interact with:

- EIF2C2,
- GEMIN4,
- GEMIN5,
- LSM2,
- SMN1,
- SNRPB,
- SNRPD3 and
- SNRPG,
- SNRPD1,
- SNRPD2,
- SNRPE,
- SNRPF, and
- SIP1.
