= Gem-associated protein 6 =

Protein found in humans

GEMIN6
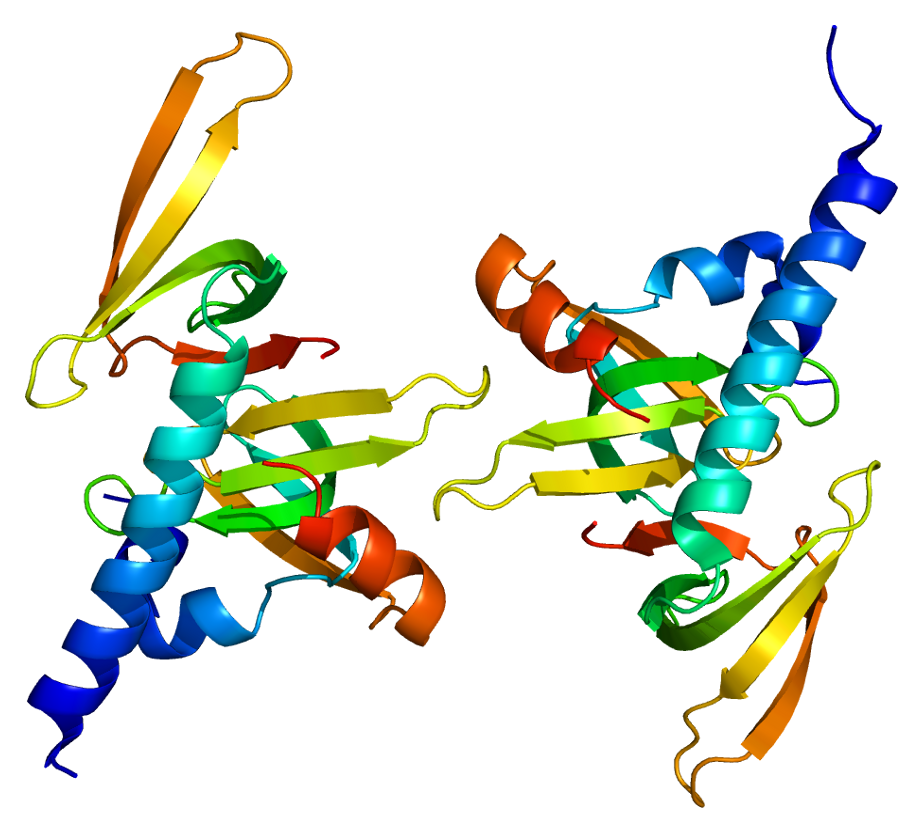

Identifiers
- Aliases: GEMIN6, gem nuclear organelle associated protein 6
- External IDs: OMIM: 607006; MGI: 1914492; GeneCards: GEMIN6
Available structures
PDB	Ortholog search: PDBe RCSB
PDB	List of PDB id codes 1Y96

Gene location (Human)
Chr.	Chromosome 2 (human)
Band	2p22.1	Start	38,751,534 bp
Band	2p22.1	End	38,785,002 bp

Gene location (Mouse)
Chr.	Chromosome 17 (mouse)
Band	17|17 E3	Start	80,531,870 bp
Band	17|17 E3	End	80,535,926 bp
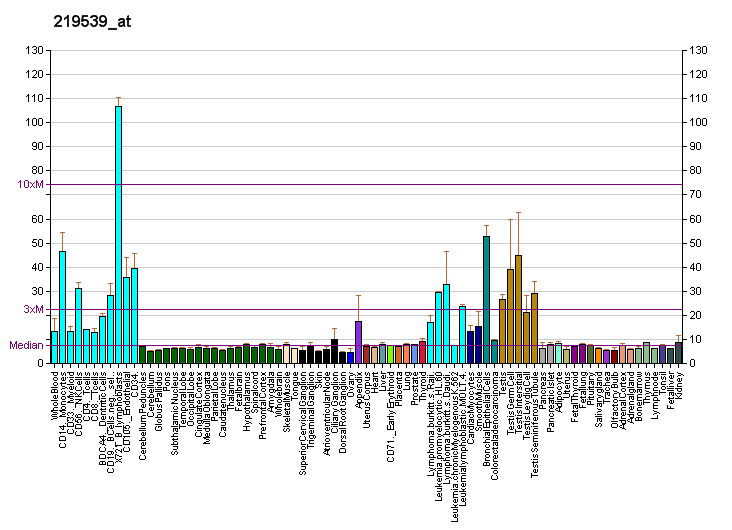
RNA expression pattern
Bgee	Human / Mouse (ortholog); Top expressed in: tendon of biceps brachii; right testis; left testis; islet of Langerhans; oocyte; mucosa of transverse colon; right adrenal gland; bronchial epithelial cell; right adrenal cortex; right lobe of liver / Top expressed in: epiblast; embryo; blastocyst; morula; primary oocyte; embryo; yolk sac; proximal tubule; placenta; ventricular zone; More reference expression data
BioGPS	More reference expression data
Gene ontology
Molecular function	protein binding
Cellular component	cytoplasm; SMN complex; SMN-Sm protein complex; cytosol; nuclear body; nucleus; nucleoplasm; gemini of coiled bodies
Biological process	mRNA splicing, via spliceosome; mRNA processing; spliceosomal complex assembly; RNA splicing; spliceosomal snRNP assembly; import into nucleus
Sources:Amigo / QuickGO
Orthologs
Databases	NCBI: entry; OMA: entry
Species	Human	Mouse
Entrez	79833	67242
Ensembl	ENSG00000152147	ENSMUSG00000055760
UniProt	Q8WXD5	Q9CX53
RefSeq (mRNA)	NM_024775	NM_026053; NM_001355458
RefSeq (protein)	NP_079051	NP_080329; NP_001342387
Location (UCSC)	Chr 2: 38.75 – 38.79 Mb	Chr 17: 80.53 – 80.54 Mb
PubMed search
- Wikidata
View/Edit Human	View/Edit Mouse

Gem-associated protein 6 is a protein that in humans is encoded by the GEMIN6 gene. The gem-associated proteins are those found in the gems of Cajal bodies.

== Function ==
GEMIN6 is part of a large macromolecular complex, the SMN localized to both the cytoplasm and the nucleus, that plays a role in the cytoplasmic assembly of small nuclear ribonucleoproteins (snRNPs). Other members of this complex include SMN (MIM 600354), GEMIN2 (SIP1; MIM 602595), GEMIN3 (DDX20; MIM 606168), GEMIN4 (MIM 606969), and GEMIN5 (MIM 607005).[supplied by OMIM]

== Interactions ==
Gem-associated protein 6 has been shown to interact with gem-associated protein 7.
