= Small nuclear ribonucleoprotein D2 =

Protein-coding gene in the species Homo sapiens

SNRPD2
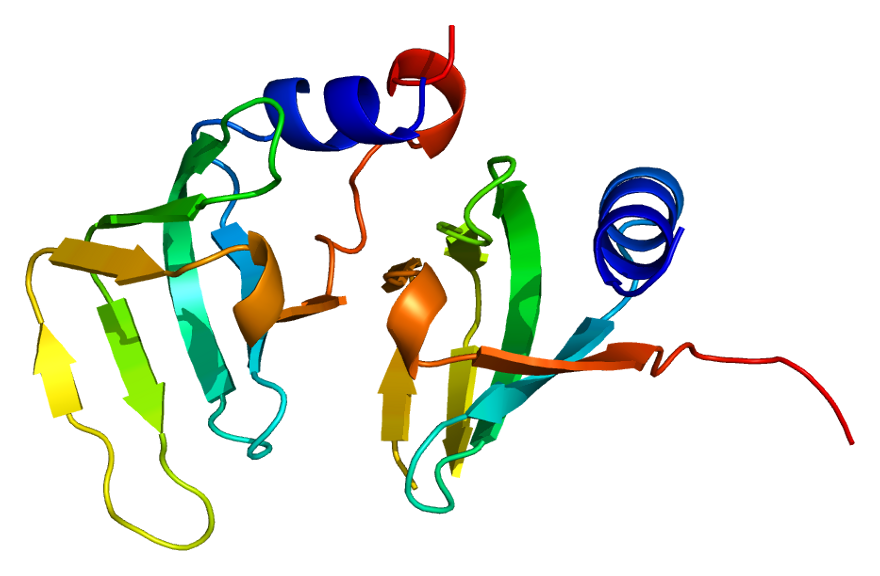

Identifiers
- Aliases: SNRPD2, SMD2, SNRPD1, Sm-D2, Small nuclear ribonucleoprotein D2, small nuclear ribonucleoprotein D2 polypeptide
- External IDs: OMIM: 601061; MGI: 98345; GeneCards: SNRPD2
Available structures
PDB	Ortholog search: PDBe RCSB
PDB	List of PDB id codes 1B34, 3CW1, 3PGW, 3S6N, 4F7U, 4PJO, 4V98, 4WZJ, 3JCR

Gene location (Human)
Chr.	Chromosome 19 (human)
Band	19q13.32	Start	45,687,460 bp
Band	19q13.32	End	45,692,569 bp

Gene location (Mouse)
Chr.	Chromosome 7 (mouse)
Band	7|7 A3	Start	18,883,647 bp
Band	7|7 A3	End	18,887,467 bp
RNA expression pattern
Bgee	Human / Mouse (ortholog); Top expressed in: beta cell; embryo; corpus epididymis; oral cavity; left ovary; ganglionic eminence; tail of epididymis; caput epididymis; superficial temporal artery; vulva / Top expressed in: yolk sac; synovial joint; urinary bladder; ankle joint; embryo; ventricular zone; embryo; lens; epiblast; ganglionic eminence; More reference expression data
BioGPS	n/a
Gene ontology
Molecular function	protein binding; RNA binding; U1 snRNP binding
Cellular component	cytoplasm; SMN-Sm protein complex; cytosol; catalytic step 2 spliceosome; U4/U6 x U5 tri-snRNP complex; U5 snRNP; U12-type spliceosomal complex; U2 snRNP; nucleoplasm; methylosome; precatalytic spliceosome; small nuclear ribonucleoprotein complex; pICln-Sm protein complex; spliceosomal complex; U4 snRNP; extracellular exosome; nucleus; U1 snRNP; U2-type precatalytic spliceosome; U2-type catalytic step 2 spliceosome
Biological process	mRNA splicing, via spliceosome; mRNA processing; spliceosomal snRNP assembly; spliceosomal complex assembly; RNA splicing; import into nucleus
Sources:Amigo / QuickGO
Orthologs
Databases	NCBI: entry; OMA: entry
Species	Human	Mouse
Entrez	6633	107686
Ensembl	ENSG00000125743	ENSMUSG00000040824
UniProt	P62316	P62317
RefSeq (mRNA)	NM_004597; NM_177542; NM_001369751; NM_001369752; NM_001384647	NM_026943
RefSeq (protein)	NP_004588; NP_808210; NP_001356680; NP_001356681	NP_081219
Location (UCSC)	Chr 19: 45.69 – 45.69 Mb	Chr 7: 18.88 – 18.89 Mb
PubMed search
- Wikidata
View/Edit Human	View/Edit Mouse

Small nuclear ribonucleoprotein Sm D2 is a protein that in humans is encoded by the SNRPD2 gene. It belongs to the small nuclear ribonucleoprotein core protein family, and is required for pre-mRNA splicing and small nuclear ribonucleoprotein biogenesis. Alternative splicing occurs at this locus and two transcript variants encoding the same protein have been identified.

== Interactions ==
Small nuclear ribonucleoprotein D2 has been shown to interact with DDX20, Small nuclear ribonucleoprotein D1, Small nuclear ribonucleoprotein polypeptide F, CDC5L and SMN1.
