= Gem-associated protein 7 =

Protein-coding gene in the species Homo sapiens

GEMIN7
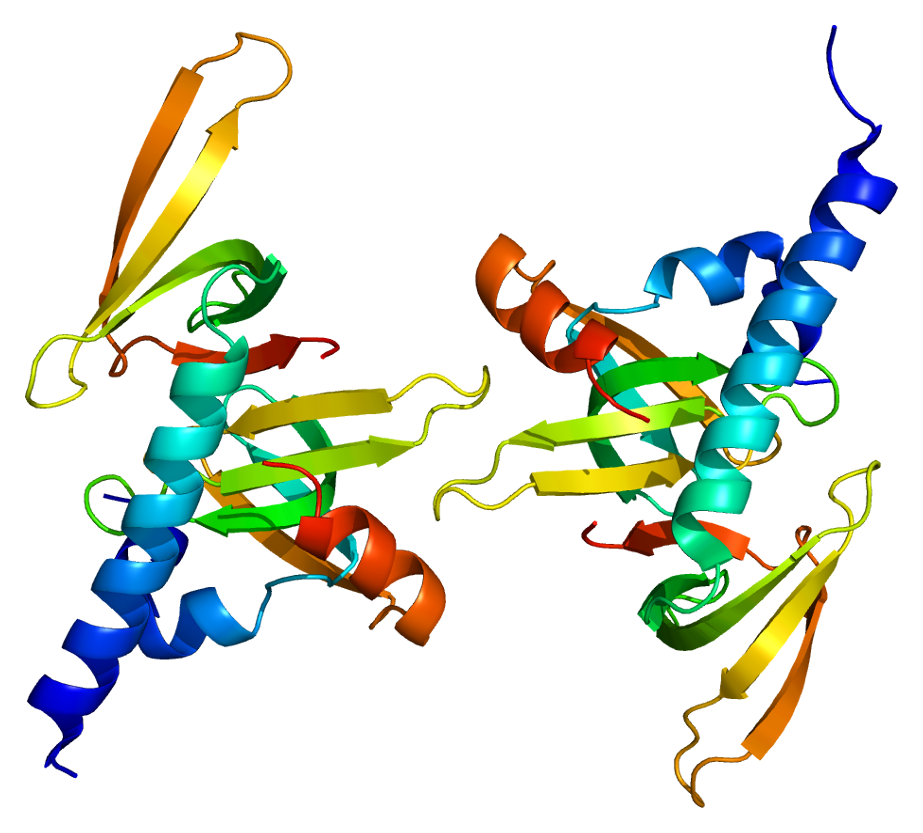

Identifiers
- Aliases: GEMIN7, SIP3, gem nuclear organelle associated protein 7
- External IDs: OMIM: 607419; MGI: 1916981; GeneCards: GEMIN7
Available structures
PDB	Ortholog search: PDBe RCSB
PDB	List of PDB id codes 1Y96

Gene location (Human)
Chr.	Chromosome 19 (human)
Band	19q13.32	Start	45,079,195 bp
Band	19q13.32	End	45,091,518 bp

Gene location (Mouse)
Chr.	Chromosome 7 (mouse)
Band	7|7 A3	Start	19,298,871 bp
Band	7|7 A3	End	19,311,520 bp
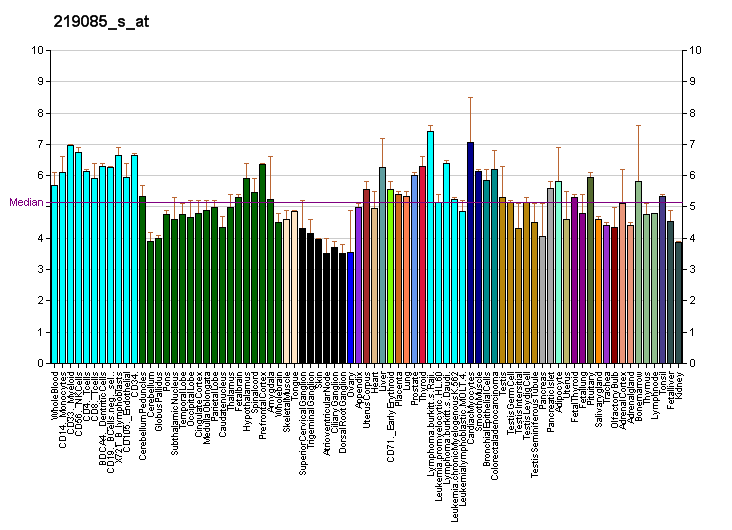
RNA expression pattern
Bgee	Human / Mouse (ortholog); Top expressed in: mucosa of transverse colon; granulocyte; mucosa of ileum; tibialis anterior muscle; monocyte; gastrocnemius muscle; muscle of thigh; spleen; testicle; right lobe of liver / Top expressed in: interventricular septum; right kidney; granulocyte; muscle of thigh; embryo; embryo; yolk sac; lip; neural tube; ventricular zone; More reference expression data
BioGPS	More reference expression data
Gene ontology
Molecular function	protein binding
Cellular component	cytoplasm; cytosol; nuclear body; nucleus; nucleoplasm; SMN complex; SMN-Sm protein complex; gemini of coiled bodies
Biological process	mRNA splicing, via spliceosome; mRNA processing; RNA splicing; spliceosomal snRNP assembly; import into nucleus
Sources:Amigo / QuickGO
Orthologs
Databases	NCBI: entry; OMA: entry
Species	Human	Mouse
Entrez	79760	69731
Ensembl	ENSG00000142252	ENSMUSG00000044709
UniProt	Q9H840	Q9CWY4
RefSeq (mRNA)	NM_001007269; NM_001007270; NM_024707; NM_001319054; NM_001319055	NM_027189
RefSeq (protein)	NP_001007270; NP_001007271; NP_001305983; NP_001305984; NP_078983	NP_081465
Location (UCSC)	Chr 19: 45.08 – 45.09 Mb	Chr 7: 19.3 – 19.31 Mb
PubMed search
- Wikidata
View/Edit Human	View/Edit Mouse

Gem-associated protein 7 is a protein that in humans is encoded by the GEMIN7 gene. The gem-associated proteins are those found in the gems of Cajal bodies.

== Function ==
The protein encoded by this gene is a component of the core SMN complex, which is required for pre-mRNA splicing in the nucleus. The encoded protein is found in the nucleoplasm, in nuclear "gems" (Gemini of Cajal bodies), and in the cytoplasm. Three transcript variants encoding the same protein have been found for this gene.

== Interactions ==
Gem-associated protein 7 has been shown to interact with SMN1 and Gem-associated protein 6.
