= Gem-associated protein 2 =

Protein-coding gene in the species Homo sapiens

GEMIN2

Identifiers
- Aliases: GEMIN2, SIP1, SIP1-delta, Survival of motor neuron protein-interacting protein 1, gem nuclear organelle associated protein 2
- External IDs: OMIM: 602595; MGI: 1913853; GeneCards: GEMIN2
Available structures
PDB	Ortholog search: PDBe RCSB
PDB	List of PDB id codes 2LEH, 3S6N

Gene location (Human)
Chr.	Chromosome 14 (human)
Band	14q21.1	Start	39,114,285 bp
Band	14q21.1	End	39,136,973 bp

Gene location (Mouse)
Chr.	Chromosome 12 (mouse)
Band	12|12 C1	Start	59,060,179 bp
Band	12|12 C1	End	59,075,256 bp
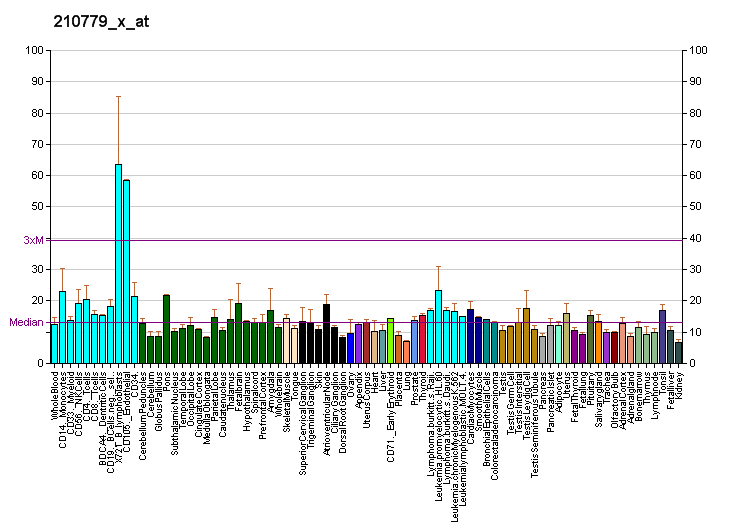

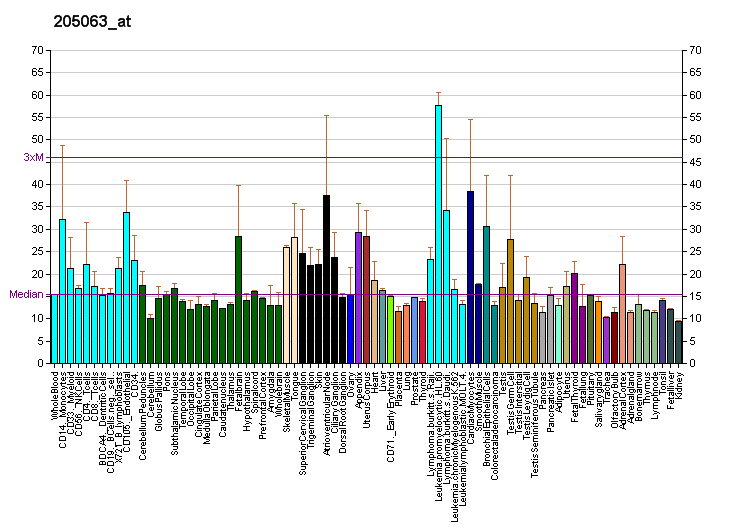

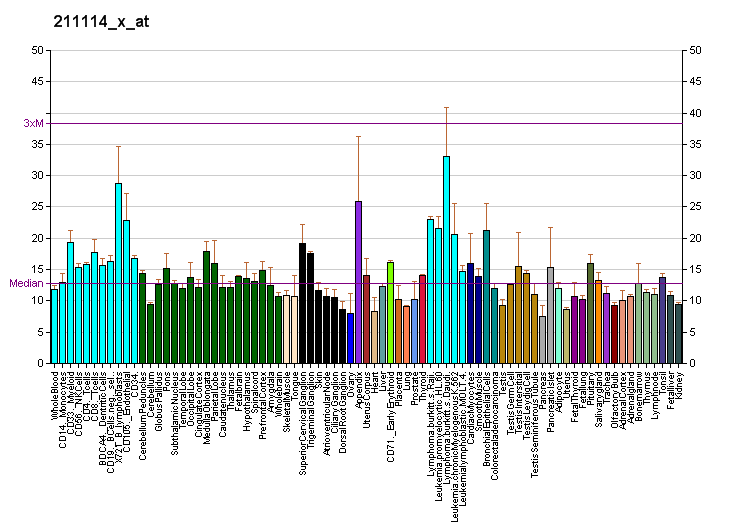
RNA expression pattern
Bgee	Human / Mouse (ortholog); Top expressed in: buccal mucosa cell; secondary oocyte; sperm; ventricular zone; ganglionic eminence; gonad; right testis; left testis; testicle; gastrocnemius muscle / Top expressed in: morula; otic placode; epiblast; embryo; embryo; endocardial cushion; primitive streak; otic vesicle; abdominal wall; ureter; More reference expression data
BioGPS	More reference expression data
Gene ontology
Molecular function	protein binding
Cellular component	SMN complex; SMN-Sm protein complex; cytosol; spliceosomal complex; nucleolus; intracellular anatomical structure; nucleus; nucleoplasm; cytoplasm; nuclear body; gemini of coiled bodies
Biological process	RNA splicing, via transesterification reactions; mRNA processing; spliceosomal complex assembly; RNA splicing; spliceosomal snRNP assembly; import into nucleus
Sources:Amigo / QuickGO
Orthologs
Databases	NCBI: entry; OMA: entry
Species	Human	Mouse
Entrez	8487	66603
Ensembl	ENSG00000092208	ENSMUSG00000060121
UniProt	O14893	Q9CQQ4
RefSeq (mRNA)	NM_001009182; NM_001009183; NM_003616	NM_025656
RefSeq (protein)	NP_001009182; NP_001009183; NP_003607	NP_079932
Location (UCSC)	Chr 14: 39.11 – 39.14 Mb	Chr 12: 59.06 – 59.08 Mb
PubMed search
- Wikidata
View/Edit Human	View/Edit Mouse

Gem-associated protein 2 (GEMIN2), also called survival of motor neuron protein-interacting protein 1 (SIP1), is a protein that in humans is encoded by the GEMIN2 gene.

== Interactions ==
Gem-associated protein 2 has been shown to interact with DDX20 and SMN1.

== See also ==
- Gideon Dreyfuss
- Spinal muscular atrophy
