= SMN1 =

Protein-coding gene in humans

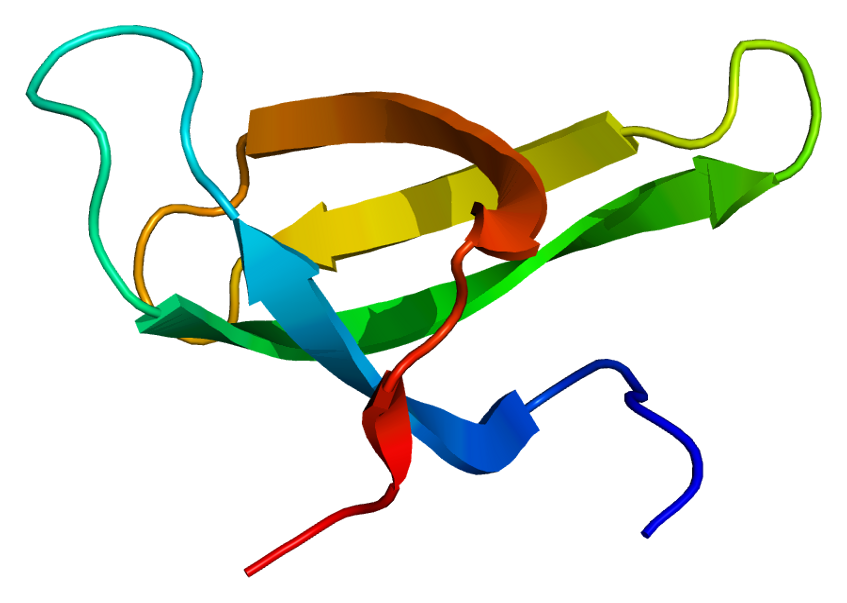

Identifiers
- Aliases: SMN1, BCD541, GEMIN1, SMNT, T-BCD541, TDRD16A, survival of motor neuron 1, telomeric, survival motor neuron 1, telomeric, SMA1, SMA4, SMA@, SMA2, SMA, SMA3, SMN
- External IDs: OMIM: 600354; MGI: 109257; GeneCards: SMN1
Available structures
PDB	Ortholog search: PDBe RCSB
PDB	List of PDB id codes 1G5V, 1MHN, 2LEH, 3S6N, 4A4E, 4A4G, 4GLI, 4NL6, 4NL7, 4QQ6

Gene location (Human)
Chr.	Chromosome 5 (human)
Band	5q13.2	Start	70,925,030 bp
Band	5q13.2	End	70,953,942 bp

Gene location (Mouse)
Chr.	Chromosome 13 (mouse)
Band	13 D1|13 52.99 cM	Start	100,261,360 bp
Band	13 D1|13 52.99 cM	End	100,274,198 bp
RNA expression pattern
Bgee	Human / Mouse (ortholog); Top expressed in: ventricular zone; ganglionic eminence; canal of the cervix; left ovary; right ovary; Achilles tendon; endometrium; left uterine tube; ectocervix; tibial nerve / Top expressed in: zygote; yolk sac; epiblast; morula; morula; tail of embryo; embryo; embryo; blastocyst; ventricular zone; More reference expression data
BioGPS	n/a
Gene ontology
Molecular function	protein binding; RNA binding; identical protein binding
Cellular component	cytoplasm; SMN-Sm protein complex; cytosol; Cajal body; nucleoplasm; SMN complex; Z discdkac; neuron projection; cytoplasmic ribonucleoprotein granule; nucleus; gemini of coiled bodies; perikaryon; cell projection
Biological process	DNA-templated transcription, termination; mRNA processing; nervous system development; spliceosomal snRNP assembly; spliceosomal complex assembly; RNA splicing; import into nucleus
Sources:Amigo / QuickGO
Orthologs
Databases	NCBI: entry; OMA: entry
Species	Human	Mouse
Entrez	6606	20595
Ensembl	ENSG00000275349; ENSG00000172062	ENSMUSG00000021645
UniProt	Q16637	P97801
RefSeq (mRNA)	NM_000344; NM_001297715; NM_022874	NM_001252629; NM_011420
RefSeq (protein)	NP_059107; NP_075013; NP_075014; NP_075015; NP_000335 NP_001284644; NP_075012	NP_001239558; NP_035550
Location (UCSC)	Chr 5: 70.93 – 70.95 Mb	Chr 13: 100.26 – 100.27 Mb
PubMed search
- Wikidata
View/Edit Human	View/Edit Mouse

Survival of motor neuron 1 (SMN1), also known as component of gems 1 or GEMIN1, is a gene that encodes the SMN protein in humans.The chemical formula is:C_{1394}H_{2154}N_{384}O_{438}S_{13}

== Gene ==
SMN1 is the telomeric copy of the gene encoding the SMN protein; the centromeric copy is termed SMN2. SMN1 and SMN2 are part of a 500 kbp inverted duplication on chromosome 5q13. This duplicated region contains at least four genes and repetitive elements which make it prone to rearrangements and deletions. The repetitiveness and complexity of the sequence have also caused difficulty in determining the organization of this genomic region. SMN1 and SMN2 are nearly identical and encode the same protein. The critical sequence difference between the two is a single nucleotide in exon 7 which is thought to be an exon splice enhancer. It is thought that gene conversion events may involve the two genes, leading to varying copy numbers of each gene.

== Clinical significance ==
Mutations in SMN1 are associated with spinal muscular atrophy. Mutations in SMN2 alone do not lead to disease, although mutations in both SMN1 and SMN2 result in embryonic death.
