= Small Cajal body specific RNA 4 =

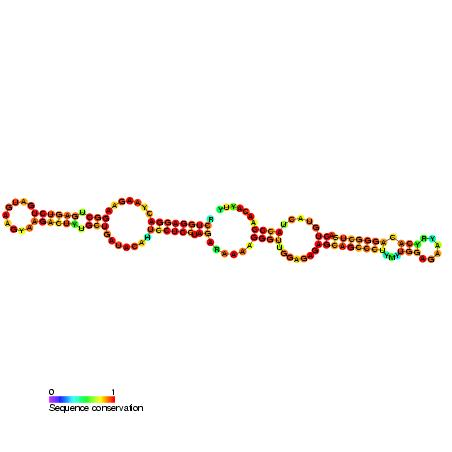
- Predicted secondary structure and sequence conservation of SCARNA4

Identifiers
- Symbol: SCARNA4
- Alt. Symbols: snoACA26
- Rfam: RF00423

Other data
- RNA type: Gene; snRNA; snoRNA; scaRNA
- Domain: Eukaryota
- GO: GO:0006396 GO:0015030 GO:0005730
- SO: SO:0000275
- PDB structures: PDBe

In molecular biology, small Cajal body specific RNA 4 (also known as ACA26) is believed to be a guide RNA of the H/ACA box class, since it has the predicted hairpin-hinge-hairpin-tail structure, conserved H/ACA-box motifs, and is found associated with GAR1. In particular, ACA26 is predicted to guide the pseudouridylation of residues U39 and U41 in U2 snRNA. Such scaRNAs are a specific class of small nuclear RNAs that localise to the Cajal bodies and guide the modification of RNA polymerase II transcribed spliceosomal RNAs U1, U2, U4, U5 and U12.
