= Small Cajal body specific RNA 6 =

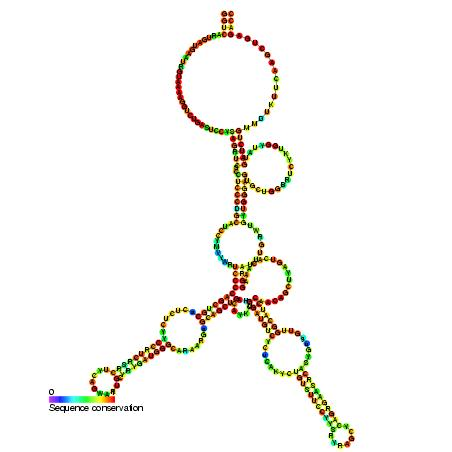
- Predicted secondary structure and sequence conservation of SCARNA6

Identifiers
- Symbol: SCARNA6
- Alt. Symbols: U88
- Rfam: RF00478

Other data
- RNA type: Gene; snRNA; snoRNA; scaRNA
- Domain: Eukaryota
- GO: GO:0006396 GO:0005730
- SO: SO:0000275
- PDB structures: PDBe

Small Cajal body specific RNA 6 (also known as SCARNA6 or U88) is a small nucleolar RNA found in Cajal bodies and believed to be involved in the pseudouridylation (isomerisation of uridine to pseudouridine) of U5 spliceosomal RNA.

scaRNAs are a specific class of small nucleolar RNAs that localise to the Cajal bodies and guide the modification of RNA polymerase II transcribed spliceosomal RNAs U1, U2, U4, U5 and U12

U88 is found associated with both fibrillarin and Gar1p and co-localises with coilin in Cajal bodies. It is an unusual guide RNA in that it is composed of both H/ACA box and a C/D box conserved domains. It is predicted to guide 2'-O-methylation of residue U41 of the U5 snRNA.

U88 is also closely related to other human snoRNAs scaRNA U87 and a mouse homologue MBI-46. In the human genome both U88 and U87 scaRNAs share the same host gene.
