= Small Cajal body specific RNA 17 =

small Cajal body-specific RNA 17
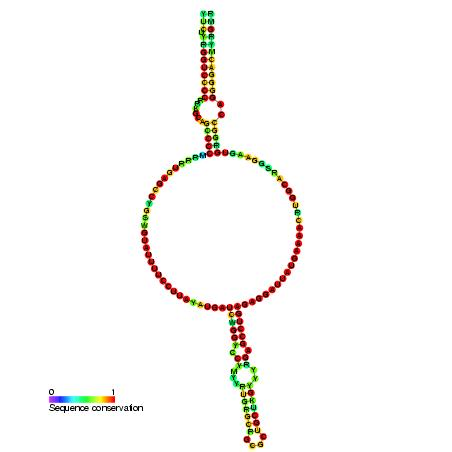
- Predicted secondary structure and sequence conservation of SCARNA17

Identifiers
- Symbol: SCARNA17
- Alt. Symbols: snoU12-22
- Rfam: RF00492

Other data
- RNA type: Gene; snRNA; snoRNA; scaRNA
- Domain: Eukaryota
- GO: GO:0006396 GO:0015030 GO:0005730
- SO: SO:0000275
- PDB structures: PDBe

Small Cajal body-specific RNA 17 (also known as U12-22 scaRNA) is a type of small nuclear RNA which localises to the cajal bodies and proposed to guide the modification of RNA polymerase II transcribed spliceosomal RNAs U1, U2, U4, U5 and U12.

The complete human U12-22/U4-8 scaRNA is composed of two tandem C/D box domains (termed U12-22 and U4-8). The 5' and 3' C/D domains are predicted to guide the 2'O-ribose methylation of residue U22 in U12 and residue C8 in U4 snRNAs respectively. This family includes only the 5' C/D box domain (U12-22) as the 3' C/D box is represented by Small Cajal body specific RNA 18. The 3' C/D domain (U4-8) was also cloned previously by Darzacq and called U91. Both the doublet (U12-22/U4-8) and singlet (U4-8) forms of this snRNA have been purified from HeLa cells. The doublet form U12-22/U4-8 has been shown to localise to the nucleoplasm and is proposed to reside in the Cajal bodies whereas the U4-8 single domain appears to accumulate in the nucleolus. In humans the genomic location of U12-88/U4-8 is intergenic and the purified transcript has been shown to possess a methylated guanosine cap suggesting it is independently transcribed by RNA polymerase II.
