= Small Cajal body specific RNA 11 =

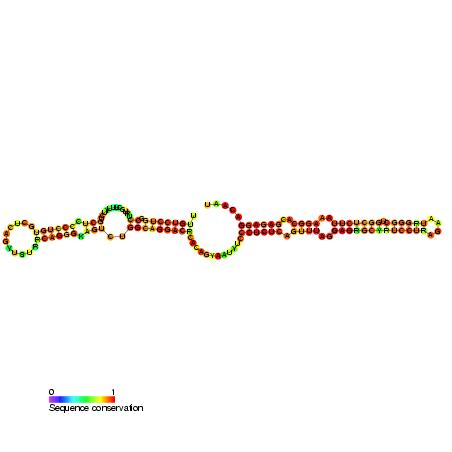
- Predicted secondary structure and sequence conservation of SCARNA11

Identifiers
- Symbol: SCARNA11
- Alt. Symbols: snoACA57
- Rfam: RF00564

Other data
- RNA type: Gene; snRNA; snoRNA; scaRNA
- Domain: Eukaryota
- GO: GO:0006396 GO:0015030 GO:0005730
- SO: SO:0000275
- PDB structures: PDBe

In molecular biology, Small Cajal body specific RNA 11 (also known as scaRNA11 or ACA57) is a small nucleolar RNA found in Cajal bodies.

scaRNAs are a specific class of small nuclear RNAs which localise to the Cajal bodies and guide the modification of RNA polymerase II transcribed spliceosomal RNAs U1, U2, U4, U5 and U12. ACA57 belongs to the H/ACA box class of guide RNAs as it has the predicted hairpin-hinge-hairpin-tail structure, conserved H/ACA-box motifs and is found associated with GAR1. ACA57 is predicted to guide the pseudouridylation of the U5 spliceosomal RNA at position U43.
