= Small Cajal body specific RNA 24 =

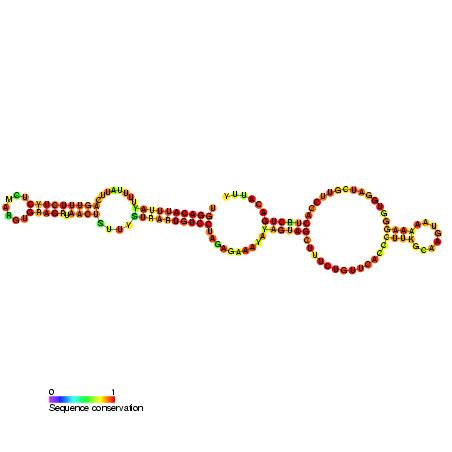
- Predicted secondary structure and sequence conservation of SCARNA24

Identifiers
- Symbol: SCARNA24
- Alt. Symbols: snoACA12
- Rfam: RF00422

Other data
- RNA type: Gene; snRNA; snoRNA; scaRNA
- Domain: Eukaryota
- GO: GO:0006396 GO:0015030 GO:0005730
- SO: SO:0000275
- PDB structures: PDBe

Small Cajal body specific RNA 24 (also known as scaRNA24 or ACA12) is a small nucleolar RNA found in Cajal bodies and believed to be involved in the pseudouridylation (isomerisation of uridine to pseudouridine) of U6 spliceosomal RNA.

scaRNAs are a specific class of small nucleolar RNAs that localise to the Cajal bodies and guide the modification of RNA polymerase II transcribed spliceosomal RNAs U1, U2, U4, U5 and U12.

ACA12 belongs to the H/ACA box class of guide RNAs as it has the predicted hairpin-hinge-hairpin-tail structure, the conserved H/ACA-box motifs and is found associated with GAR1 protein. ACA12 is predicted to guide the pseudouridylation of residue U40 of the spliceosomal U6 snRNA.
