= Small Cajal body specific RNA 20 =

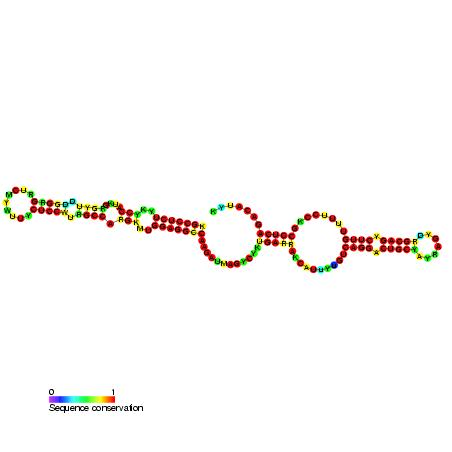
- Predicted secondary structure and sequence conservation of SCARNA20

Identifiers
- Symbol: SCARNA20
- Rfam: RF00601

Other data
- RNA type: Gene; snRNA; snoRNA; scaRNA
- Domain: Eukaryota
- GO: GO:0006396 GO:0015030 GO:0005730
- SO: SO:0000275
- PDB structures: PDBe

In molecular biology, Small Cajal body specific RNA 20 (also known as scaRNA20 or ACA66) is a small nucleolar RNA found in Cajal bodies and believed to be involved in the pseudouridylation of U12 minor spliceosomal RNA.

scaRNAs are a specific class of small nucleolar RNAs that localise to the Cajal bodies and guide the modification of RNA polymerase II transcribed spliceosomal RNAs U1, U2, U4, U5 and U12.

ACA66 (SCARNA20) is a member of the H/ACA box class of snoRNAs that guide the sites of modification of uridines to pseudouridines. This snoRNA was identified by computational screening and its expression in mouse experimentally verified by Northern blot and primer extension analysis. ACA66 is predicted to guide the pseudouridylation of residue U28 in U12 snRNA.
