= Small Cajal body specific RNA 23 =

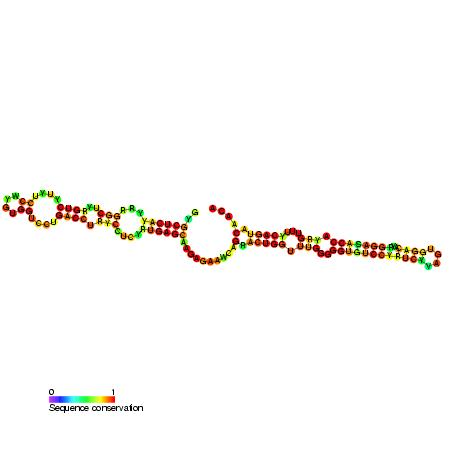
- Predicted secondary structure and sequence conservation of SCARNA23

Identifiers
- Symbol: SCARNA23
- Alt. Symbols: snoACA11
- Rfam: RF00427

Other data
- RNA type: Gene; snRNA; snoRNA; scaRNA
- Domain: Eukaryota
- GO: GO:0006396 GO:0015030 GO:0005730
- SO: SO:0000275
- PDB structures: PDBe

Small Cajal body specific RNA 23 (also known as SCARNA23 or ACA11) is a small nucleolar RNA found in Cajal bodies and believed to be involved in the pseudouridylation (isomerisation of uridine to pseudouridine) of U1 spliceosomal RNA.

scaRNAs are a specific class of small nucleolar RNAs that localise to the Cajal bodies and guide the modification of RNA polymerase II transcribed spliceosomal RNAs U1, U2, U4, U5 and U12.

ACA11 belongs to the H/ACA box class of guide RNAs as it has the predicted hairpin-hinge-hairpin-tail structure, the conserved H/ACA-box motifs and is found associated with GAR1. H/ACA snRNAs are predicted to guide the modification of uridines to pseudouridines in substrate RNAs however, no target RNA has been identified for scaRNA ACA11.
