= Small Cajal body specific RNA 15 =

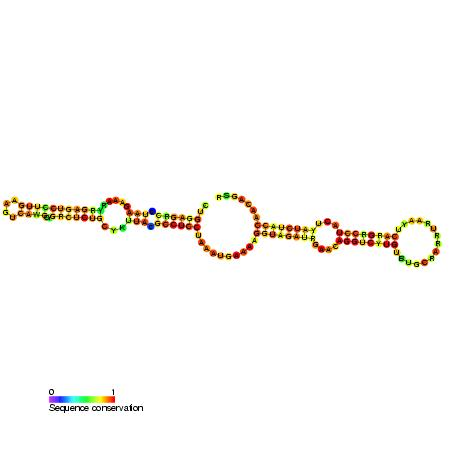
- Predicted secondary structure and sequence conservation of SCARNA15

Identifiers
- Symbol: SCARNA15
- Alt. Symbols: snoACA45
- Rfam: RF00426

Other data
- RNA type: Gene; snRNA; snoRNA; scaRNA
- Domain: Eukaryota
- GO: GO:0006396 GO:0015030 GO:0005730
- SO: SO:0000275
- PDB structures: PDBe

Small Cajal body specific RNA 15 (also known as SCARNA15 or ACA45) is a small nucleolar RNA found in Cajal bodies and believed to be involved in the pseudouridylation (isomerisation of uridine to pseudouridine) of U1 spliceosomal RNA.

scaRNAs are a specific class of small nucleolar RNAs that localise to the Cajal bodies and guide the modification of RNA polymerase II transcribed spliceosomal RNAs U1, U2, U4, U5 and U12.

ACA45 belongs to the H/ACA box class of guide RNAs as it has the predicted hairpin-hinge-hairpin-tail structure, the conserved H/ACA-box motifs and is found associated with GAR1. ACA45 is predicted to guide the pseudouridylation of residue U37 of the U2 spliceosomal snRNA.

It has been shown that human ACA45 can be processed into a 21 nucleotides long mature miRNA by the RNAse III family endoribonuclease dicer. This snoRNA product has previously been identified as mmu-miR-1839 and was shown to be processed independent of the other miRNA generating endoribonuclease drosha.
