= Small Cajal body specific RNA 16 =

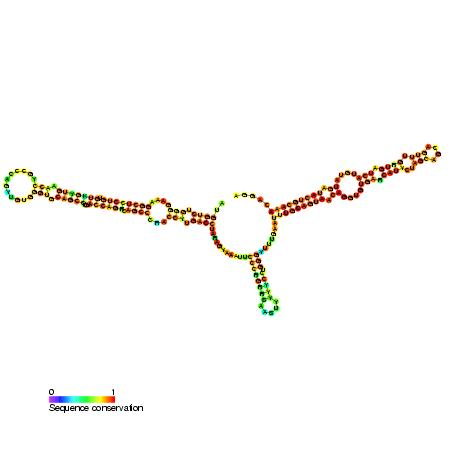
- Predicted secondary structure and sequence conservation of SCARNA16

Identifiers
- Symbol: SCARNA16
- Alt. Symbols: snoACA47
- Rfam: RF00424

Other data
- RNA type: Gene; snRNA; snoRNA; scaRNA
- Domain: Eukaryota
- GO: GO:0006396 GO:0005730
- SO: SO:0000275
- PDB structures: PDBe

Small Cajal body specific RNA 16 (also known as SCARNA16 or ACA47) is a small nucleolar RNA found in Cajal bodies and believed to be involved in the pseudouridylation (isomerisation of uridine to pseudouridine) of U1 spliceosomal RNA.

scaRNAs are a specific class of small nucleolar RNAs that localise to the Cajal bodies and guide the modification of RNA polymerase II transcribed spliceosomal RNAs U1, U2, U4, U5 and U12.

ACA47 belongs to the H/ACA box class of guide RNAs as it has the predicted hairpin-hinge-hairpin-tail structure, the conserved H/ACA-box motifs and is found associated with GAR1. ACA47 is predicted to guide the pseudouridylation of residue U5 of the U1 spliceosomal snRNA.
