= Small Cajal body specific RNA 18 =

small Cajal body-specific RNA 18
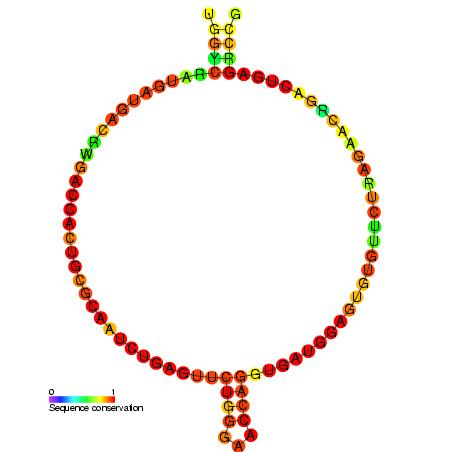
- Predicted secondary structure and sequence conservation of SCARNA18

Identifiers
- Symbol: SCARNA18
- Alt. Symbols: U91
- Rfam: RF00283

Other data
- RNA type: Gene; snRNA; snoRNA; scaRNA
- Domain: Eukaryota
- GO: GO:0006396 GO:0015030 GO:0005730
- SO: SO:0000275
- PDB structures: PDBe

small Cajal body-specific RNA 18 (also known as U91 or U4-8) is a type of small nuclear RNA which localises to the cajal bodies and proposed to guide the modification of RNA polymerase II transcribed spliceosomal RNAs U1, U2, U4, U5 and U12.

This snoRNA U91 appears to be belong to the C/D box class of snoRNAs. It was identified by Darzacq and is predicted to guide the 2'O-ribose methylation of U4 snRNA C8. This C/D domain was later found associated in tandem with another C/D box domain U12-22. Both the doublet (U12-22/U4-8) and singlet (U4-8) forms of this snRNA have been purified from Hela cells. The doublet form U12-22/U4-8 has been shown to localise to the nucleoplasm and is proposed to reside in the Cajal bodies whereas the U4-8 single domain appears to accumulate in the nucleolus. In humans the genomic location of U12-88/U4-8 is intergenic and the purified transcript has been shown to possess a methylated guanosine cap suggesting it is independently transcribed by RNA pol II.
