= Small Cajal body specific RNA 13 =

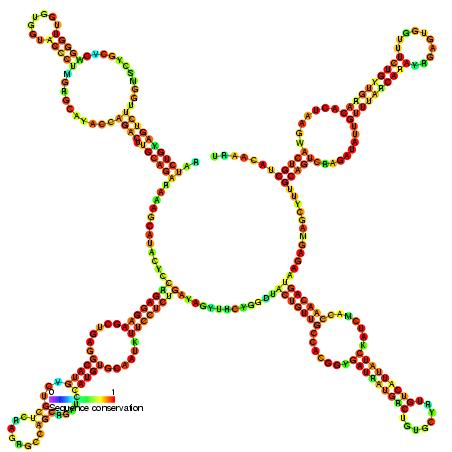
- Predicted secondary structure and sequence conservation of SCARNA13

Identifiers
- Symbol: SCARNA13
- Alt. Symbols: U93
- Rfam: RF00231

Other data
- RNA type: Gene; snRNA; snoRNA; scaRNA
- Domain: Eukaryota
- GO: GO:0006396 GO:0015030 GO:0005730
- SO: SO:0000275
- PDB structures: PDBe

In molecular biology, Small Cajal body specific RNA 13 (also known as scaRNA13 or U93) is a small nucleolar RNA found in Cajal bodies and believed to be involved in the pseudouridylation of U2 and U5 spliceosomal RNA.

scaRNAs are a specific class of small nucleolar RNAs that localise to the Cajal bodies and guide the modification of RNA polymerase II transcribed spliceosomal RNAs U1, U2, U4, U5 and U12.

U93 is composed of two tandemly arranged box H/ACA box sequence motifs and belongs to the H/ACA box class of guide RNAs. U93 is predicted to guide pseudouridylation of U2 spliceosomal snRNA residue U54 and residue U53 of snRNA U5.
