= Small Cajal body specific RNA 14 =

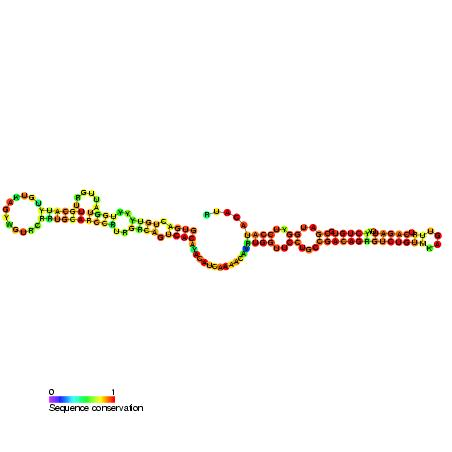
- Predicted secondary structure and sequence conservation of SCARNA14

Identifiers
- Symbol: SCARNA14
- Alt. Symbols: snoU100
- Rfam: RF00582

Other data
- RNA type: Gene; snRNA; snoRNA; scaRNA
- Domain: Eukaryota
- GO: GO:0006396 GO:0015030 GO:0005730
- SO: SO:0000275
- PDB structures: PDBe

In molecular biology, Small Cajal body specific RNA 14 (also known as scaRNA14 or U100) is a small nucleolar RNA found in Cajal bodies.

scaRNAs are a specific class of small nucleolar RNAs which localise to the Cajal bodies and guide the modification of RNA polymerase II transcribed spliceosomal RNAs U1, U2, U4, U5 and U12. U100 belongs to the H/ACA box class of guide RNAs as it has the predicted hairpin-hinge-hairpin-tail structure and the conserved H/ACA-box motifs.

U100 is the human orthologue of mouse H/ACA snoRNA MBII-201 which is also included in this family. U100 is predicted to guide the pseudouridylation of U2 snRNA at residue U7.
