= Small Cajal body specific RNA 8 =

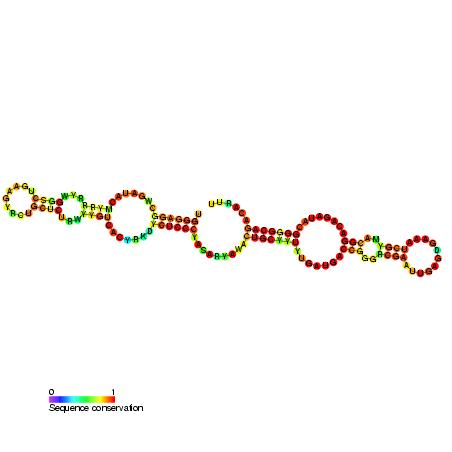
- Predicted secondary structure and sequence conservation of SCARNA8

Identifiers
- Symbol: SCARNA8
- Alt. Symbols: U92
- Rfam: RF00286

Other data
- RNA type: Gene; snRNA; snoRNA; scaRNA
- Domain: Eukaryota
- GO: GO:0006396 GO:0015030 GO:0005730
- SO: SO:0000275
- PDB structures: PDBe

Small Cajal body specific RNA 8 (also known as SCARNA8 or U92) is a small nucleolar RNA found in Cajal bodies and believed to be involved in the pseudouridylation (isomerisation of uridine to pseudouridine) of U2 spliceosomal RNA.

scaRNAs are a specific class of small nucleolar RNAs that localise to the Cajal bodies and guide the modification of RNA polymerase II transcribed spliceosomal RNAs U1, U2, U4, U5 and U12.

U92 belong to the H/ACA box class of guide RNAs as it has the predicted hairpin-hinge-hairpin-tail structure, conserved H/ACA-box motifs and is found associated with GAR1. It is predicted to guide the pseudouridylation of residues U44 in U2 snRNA. This snoRNA is related to the mouse H/ACA box snoRNA MBI-57.
