= Nucleic acid sequence =

Succession of nucleotides in a nucleic acid

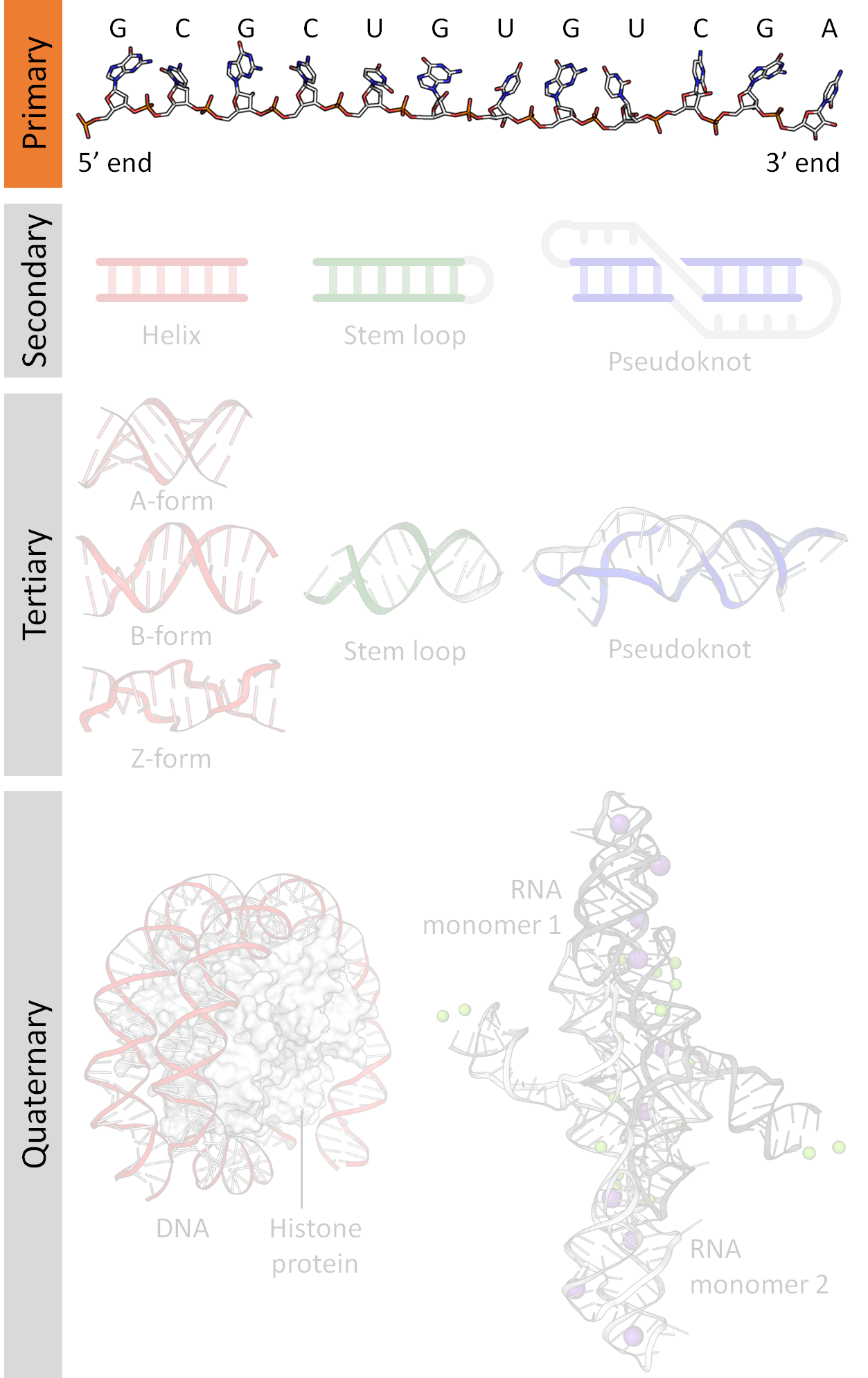
The image above contains clickable links Interactive image of nucleic acid structure (primary, secondary, tertiary, and quaternary) using DNA helices and examples from the VS ribozyme and telomerase and nucleosome. (PDB: ADNA, 1BNA, 4OCB, 4R4V, 1YMO, 1EQZ)

A nucleic acid sequence is a succession of bases within the nucleotides forming alleles within a DNA (using GACT) or RNA (GACU) molecule. This succession is denoted by a series of a set of five different letters that indicate the order of the nucleotides. By convention, sequences are usually presented from the 5' end to the 3' end. For DNA, with its double helix, there are two possible directions for the notated sequence; of these two, the sense strand is used. Because nucleic acids are normally linear (unbranched) polymers, specifying the sequence is equivalent to defining the covalent structure of the entire molecule. For this reason, the nucleic acid sequence is also termed the primary structure.

The sequence represents genetic information. Biological deoxyribonucleic acid represents the information which directs the functions of an organism.

Nucleic acids also have a secondary structure and tertiary structure. Primary structure is sometimes mistakenly referred to as "primary sequence". However there is no parallel concept of secondary or tertiary sequence.

== Nucleotides ==
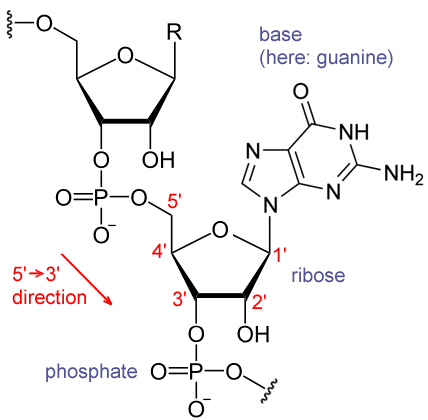
Chemical structure of RNA

A series of codons in part of a mRNA molecule. Each codon consists of three nucleotides, usually representing a single amino acid.

Nucleic acids consist of a chain of linked units called nucleotides. Each nucleotide consists of three subunits: a phosphate group and a sugar (ribose in the case of RNA, deoxyribose in DNA) make up the backbone of the nucleic acid strand, and attached to the sugar is one of a set of nucleobases. The nucleobases are important in base pairing of strands to form higher-level secondary and tertiary structures such as the famed double helix.

The possible letters are A, C, G, and T, representing the four nucleotide bases of a DNA strand – adenine, cytosine, guanine, thymine – covalently linked to a phosphodiester backbone. In the typical case, the sequences are printed abutting one another without gaps, as in the sequence AAAGTCTGAC, read left to right in the 5' to 3' direction. With regards to transcription, a sequence is on the coding strand if it has the same order as the transcribed RNA.

One sequence can be complementary to another sequence, meaning that they have the base on each position in the complementary (i.e., A to T, C to G) and in the reverse order. For example, the complementary sequence to TTAC is GTAA. If one strand of the double-stranded DNA is considered the sense strand, then the other strand, considered the antisense strand, will have the complementary sequence to the sense strand.

=== Notation ===
While A, T, C, and G represent a particular nucleotide at a position, there are also letters that represent ambiguity which are used when more than one kind of nucleotide could occur at that position. The rules of the International Union of Pure and Applied Chemistry (IUPAC) are as follows:

For example, W means that either an adenine or a thymine could occur in that position without impairing the sequence's functionality.

List of symbols
Symbol	Meaning/derivation	Possible bases					Complement
A	Adenine	A				1	T (or U)
C	Cytosine		C			1	G
G	Guanine			G		1	C
T	Thymine				T	1	A
U	Uracil				U	1	A
W	Weak	A			T	2	W
S	Strong		C	G		2	S
M	aMino	A	C			2	K
K	Keto			G	T	2	M
R	puRine	A		G		2	Y
Y	pYrimidine		C		T	2	R
B	not A (B comes after A)		C	G	T	3	V
D	not C (D comes after C)	A		G	T	3	H
H	not G (H comes after G)	A	C		T	3	D
V	not T (V comes after T and U)	A	C	G		3	B
N	any Nucleotide (not a gap)	A	C	G	T	4	N
Z	Zero					0	Z

These symbols are also valid for RNA, except with U (uracil) replacing T (thymine).

Apart from adenine (A), cytosine (C), guanine (G), thymine (T) and uracil (U), DNA and RNA also contain bases that have been modified after the nucleic acid chain has been formed. In DNA, the most common modified base is 5-methylcytidine (m5C). In RNA, there are many modified bases, including pseudouridine (Ψ), dihydrouridine (D), inosine (I), ribothymidine (rT) and 7-methylguanosine (m7G). Hypoxanthine and xanthine are two of the many bases created through mutagen presence, both of them through deamination (replacement of the amine-group with a carbonyl-group). Hypoxanthine is produced from adenine, and xanthine is produced from guanine. Similarly, deamination of cytosine results in uracil.

Example of comparing and determining the % difference between two nucleotide sequences

- AATCCGCTAG
- AAACCCTTAG

Given the two 10-nucleotide sequences, line them up and compare the differences between them. Calculate the percent difference by taking the number of differences between the DNA bases divided by the total number of nucleotides. In this case there are three differences in the 10 nucleotide sequence. Thus there is a 30% difference.

== Biological significance ==
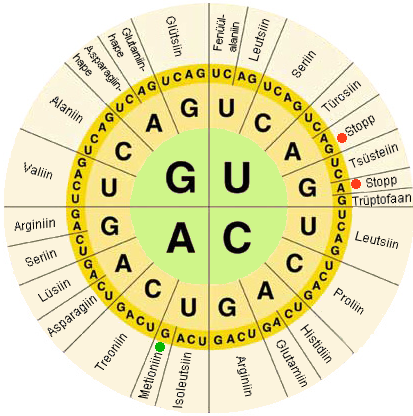
A depiction of the genetic code, by which the information contained in nucleic acids are translated into amino acid sequences in proteins.

In biological systems, nucleic acids contain information which is used by a living cell to construct specific proteins. The sequence of nucleobases on a nucleic acid strand is translated by cell machinery into a sequence of amino acids making up a protein strand. Each group of three bases, called a codon, corresponds to a single amino acid, and there is a specific genetic code by which each possible combination of three bases corresponds to a specific amino acid.

The central dogma of molecular biology outlines the mechanism by which proteins are constructed using information contained in nucleic acids. DNA is transcribed into mRNA molecules, which travel to the ribosome where the mRNA is used as a template for the construction of the protein strand. Since nucleic acids can bind to molecules with complementary sequences, there is a distinction between "sense" sequences which code for proteins, and the complementary "antisense" sequence, which is by itself nonfunctional, but can bind to the sense strand.

== Sequence determination ==
Electropherogram printout from automated sequencer for determining part of a DNA sequence

DNA sequencing is the process of determining the nucleotide sequence of a given DNA fragment. The sequence of the DNA of a living thing encodes the necessary information for that living thing to survive and reproduce. Therefore, determining the sequence is useful in fundamental research into why and how organisms live, as well as in applied subjects. Because of the importance of DNA to living things, knowledge of a DNA sequence may be useful in practically any biological research. For example, in medicine it can be used to identify, diagnose and potentially develop treatments for genetic diseases. Similarly, research into pathogens may lead to treatments for contagious diseases. Biotechnology is a burgeoning discipline, with the potential for many useful products and services.

RNA is not sequenced directly. Instead, it is copied to a DNA by reverse transcriptase, and this DNA is then sequenced.

Current sequencing methods rely on the discriminatory ability of DNA polymerases, and therefore can only distinguish four bases. An inosine (created from adenosine during RNA editing) is read as a G, and 5-methyl-cytosine (created from cytosine by DNA methylation) is read as a C. With current technology, it is difficult to sequence small amounts of DNA, as the signal is too weak to measure. This is overcome by polymerase chain reaction (PCR) amplification.

=== Digital representation ===
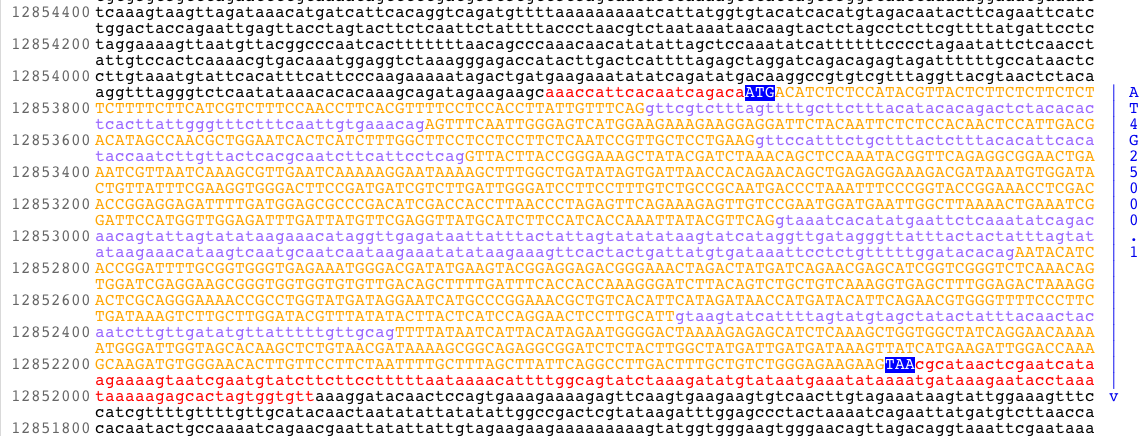
Genetic sequence in digital format.

Once a nucleic acid sequence has been obtained from an organism, it is stored in silico in digital format. Digital genetic sequences may be stored in sequence databases, be analyzed (see Sequence analysis below), be digitally altered and be used as templates for creating new actual DNA using artificial gene synthesis.

== Sequence analysis ==
Digital genetic sequences may be analyzed using the tools of bioinformatics to attempt to determine its function.

=== Genetic testing ===
The DNA in an organism's genome can be analyzed to diagnose vulnerabilities to inherited diseases, and can also be used to determine a child's paternity (genetic father) or a person's ancestry. Normally, every person carries two variations of every gene, one inherited from their mother, the other inherited from their father. The human genome is believed to contain around 20,000–25,000 genes. In addition to studying chromosomes to the level of individual genes, genetic testing in a broader sense includes biochemical tests for the possible presence of genetic diseases, or mutant forms of genes associated with increased risk of developing genetic disorders.

Genetic testing identifies changes in chromosomes, genes, or proteins. Usually, testing is used to find changes that are associated with inherited disorders. The results of a genetic test can confirm or rule out a suspected genetic condition or help determine a person's chance of developing or passing on a genetic disorder. Several hundred genetic tests are currently in use, and more are being developed.

=== Sequence alignment ===
In bioinformatics, a sequence alignment is a way of arranging the sequences of DNA, RNA, or protein to identify regions of similarity that may be due to functional, structural, or evolutionary relationships between the sequences. If two sequences in an alignment share a common ancestor, mismatches can be interpreted as point mutations and gaps as insertion or deletion mutations (indels) introduced in one or both lineages in the time since they diverged from one another. In sequence alignments of proteins, the degree of similarity between amino acids occupying a particular position in the sequence can be interpreted as a rough measure of how conserved a particular region or sequence motif is among lineages. The absence of substitutions, or the presence of only very conservative substitutions (that is, the substitution of amino acids whose side chains have similar biochemical properties) in a particular region of the sequence, suggest that this region has structural or functional importance. Although DNA and RNA nucleotide bases are more similar to each other than are amino acids, the conservation of base pairs can indicate a similar functional or structural role.

Computational phylogenetics makes extensive use of sequence alignments in the construction and interpretation of phylogenetic trees, which are used to classify the evolutionary relationships between homologous genes represented in the genomes of divergent species. The degree to which sequences in a query set differ is qualitatively related to the sequences' evolutionary distance from one another. Roughly speaking, high sequence identity suggests that the sequences in question have a comparatively young most recent common ancestor, while low identity suggests that the divergence is more ancient. This approximation, which reflects the "molecular clock" hypothesis that a roughly constant rate of evolutionary change can be used to extrapolate the elapsed time since two genes first diverged (that is, the coalescence time), assumes that the effects of mutation and selection are constant across sequence lineages. Therefore, it does not account for possible differences among organisms or species in the rates of DNA repair or the possible functional conservation of specific regions in a sequence. (In the case of nucleotide sequences, the molecular clock hypothesis in its most basic form also discounts the difference in acceptance rates between silent mutations that do not alter the meaning of a given codon and other mutations that result in a different amino acid being incorporated into the protein.) More statistically accurate methods allow the evolutionary rate on each branch of the phylogenetic tree to vary, thus producing better estimates of coalescence times for genes.

=== Sequence motifs ===
Frequently the primary structure encodes motifs that are of functional importance. Some examples of sequence motifs are: the C/D and H/ACA boxes of snoRNAs, Sm binding site found in spliceosomal RNAs such as U1, U2, U4, U5, U6, U12 and U3, the Shine-Dalgarno sequence, the Kozak consensus sequence and the RNA polymerase III terminator.

=== Sequence entropy ===
In bioinformatics, a sequence entropy, also known as sequence complexity or information profile, is a numerical sequence providing a quantitative measure of the local complexity of a DNA sequence, independently of the direction of processing. The manipulations of the information profiles enable the analysis of the sequences using alignment-free techniques, such as for example in motif and rearrangements detection.

== See also ==
- Gene structure
- Nucleic acid structure determination
- Quaternary numeral system
- Single-nucleotide polymorphism (SNP)
