= U91 =

U91 may refer to:

- German submarine U-91, various vessels
- Grasmere Airport, in Owyhee County, Idaho, United States
- Small Cajal body specific RNA 18
