= U92 =

U92 may refer to:

== Radio stations ==
- DWFM, in Manila, Philippines
- KNCU, in Newport, Oregon
- KUUU, in Utah
- WQMU, in Pennsylvania
- WWVU-FM, owned by West Virginia University
- WYUU, in Tampa, Florida

== Other uses ==
- German submarine U-92, various vessels
- Small Cajal body specific RNA 8
- Uppland Runic Inscription 92
- Uranium
