= Small Cajal body specific RNA 3 =

Type of scaRNA

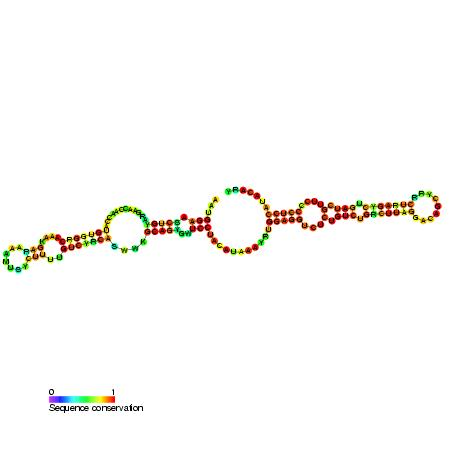

Identifiers
- Symbol: SCARNA3
- Rfam: RF00565

Other data
- RNA type: Gene; snRNA; snoRNA; scaRNA;
- PDB structures: PDBe

Small Cajal body specific RNA 3 (otherwise known as scaRNA25, HBI-100, MBI-100, and MBI-114) is a scaRNA, which are a class of ncRNAs characterised as small nuclear RNAs localised to the Cajal bodies.

ScaRNA25 was originally identified in a large scale cloning project in mice. Later sequence analysis predicted that this RNA guides the pseudouridylation of position U40 in the U6 snRNA.
