= RNU2-19P =

Small nucleolar RNA U2-19
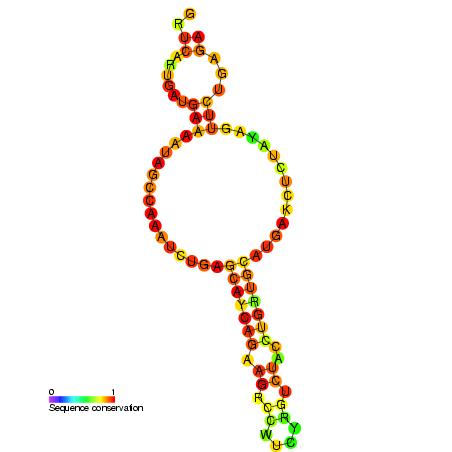
- Predicted secondary structure and sequence conservation of snoU2_19

Identifiers
- Symbol: snoU2_19
- Rfam: RF00494

Other data
- RNA type: Gene; snRNA; snoRNA; CD-box
- Domain: Eukaryota
- GO: GO:0006396 GO:0005730
- SO: SO:0000593
- PDB structures: PDBe

In molecular biology, RU2-19 is a pseudogene that's related to genes that encode RNAs that function in the modification of other small nuclear RNAs (snRNAs). This type of modifying RNA is usually located in the nucleolus of the eukaryotic cell which is a major site of snRNA biogenesis. It is known as a small nucleolar RNA (snoRNA) and is also often referred to as a guide RNA. snoRNA U2-19 belongs to the C/D box class of snoRNAs which contain the conserved sequence motifs known as the C box (UGAUGA) and the D box (CUGA). Most of the members of the box C/D family function in directing site-specific 2'-O-methylation of substrate RNAs. snoRNA U2-19 directs 2'-O-methylation of U2 spliceosomal RNA G-19.
