= TeloSII ncRNAs =

TeloSII (Telo-box and Site II) non-coding RNAs were discovered by selecting Telo and SII element containing sequences in a whole genome screening in Arabidopsis. These elements have been shown to coordinate the expression of protein-coding genes related to ribosome biogenesis throughout the cell cycle. The ncRNAs identified in this study were snoRNAs, scaRNAs, orphan snoRNAs for which no RNA target could be found, dicistronic sno-miRNA genes (sno-miR775) and many novel ncRNAs.
