= EAF2 =

Protein-coding gene in the species Homo sapiens

Identifiers
- Aliases: EAF2, BM040, TRAITS, U19, ELL associated factor 2
- External IDs: OMIM: 607659; MGI: 2146616; GeneCards: EAF2

Gene location (Human)
Chr.	Chromosome 3 (human)
Band	3q13.33	Start	121,835,183 bp
Band	3q13.33	End	121,886,526 bp

Gene location (Mouse)
Chr.	Chromosome 16 (mouse)
Band	16|16 B3	Start	36,613,246 bp
Band	16|16 B3	End	36,695,365 bp
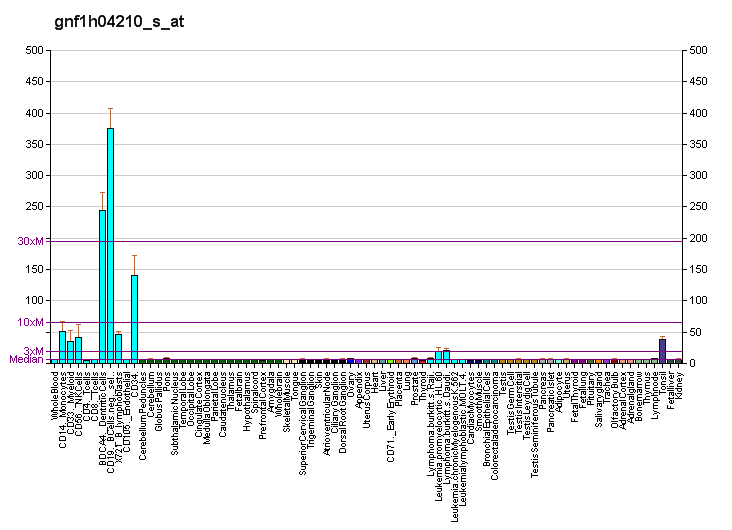

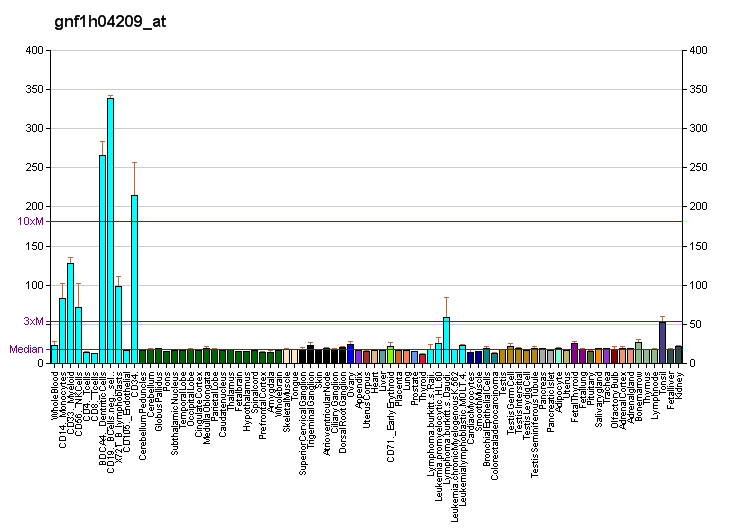

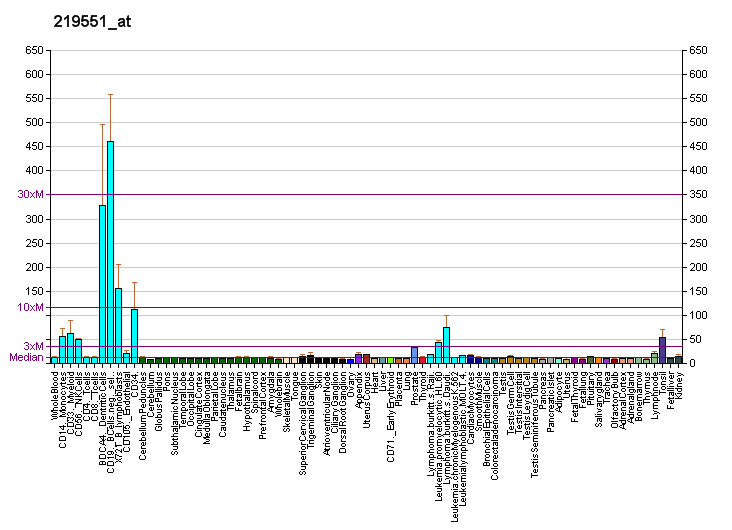
RNA expression pattern
Bgee	Human / Mouse (ortholog); Top expressed in: bone marrow cell; monocyte; lymph node; trabecular bone; granulocyte; appendix; kidney tubule; epithelium of nasopharynx; rectum; spleen / Top expressed in: female urethra; right kidney; proximal tubule; lacrimal gland; epithelium of urethra; epithelium of female urethra; seminal vesicula; pelvic part of vagina; male urethra; epithelium of male urethra; More reference expression data
BioGPS	More reference expression data
Gene ontology
Molecular function	DNA-binding transcription activator activity, RNA polymerase II-specific; RNA polymerase II transcription regulatory region sequence-specific DNA binding; protein binding
Cellular component	nuclear speck; transcription elongation factor complex; super elongation complex; nucleus; nucleoplasm
Biological process	positive regulation of transcription, DNA-templated; regulation of transcription, DNA-templated; negative regulation of cell growth; negative regulation of epithelial cell proliferation involved in prostate gland development; positive regulation of transcription by RNA polymerase II; transcription, DNA-templated; apoptotic process; transcription by RNA polymerase II; transcription elongation from RNA polymerase II promoter
Sources:Amigo / QuickGO
Orthologs
Databases	NCBI: entry; OMA: entry
Species	Human	Mouse
Entrez	55840	106389
Ensembl	ENSG00000145088	ENSMUSG00000022838
UniProt	Q96CJ1	Q91ZD6
RefSeq (mRNA)	NM_018456; NM_001320041	NM_001113401; NM_001113405; NM_134111; NM_001358102
RefSeq (protein)	NP_001306970; NP_060926	NP_001106872; NP_001106876; NP_598872; NP_001345031
Location (UCSC)	Chr 3: 121.84 – 121.89 Mb	Chr 16: 36.61 – 36.7 Mb
PubMed search
- Wikidata
View/Edit Human	View/Edit Mouse

ELL-associated factor 2 is a protein that in humans is encoded by the EAF2 gene. It is part of the EAF family of proteins and plays a role in transcriptional elongation by interacting with ELL proteins.
