= U93 =

U93 may refer to:

- German submarine U-93, various vessels
- United Airlines Flight 93, a plane that was hijacked and crashed when the passengers fought back in the September 11 attacks
- Small Cajal body specific RNA 13
- WNDV-FM, a radio station serving South Bend, Indiana
