= U100 =

U100 may refer to:

- Embraer U-100, a Brazilian Air Force utility aircraft
- German submarine U-100, various vessels
- MSI Wind U100, a laptop
- Small Cajal body specific RNA 14
- Ultimax 100, a light machine gun
- Uppland Runic Inscription 100
