= RNU4-2 syndrome =

Genetic disorder

- Other names: ReNU syndrome, NEDHAFA
- Specialty: Neurology
- Symptoms: Hypotonia, intellectual disability, dysmorphic facial features, ventriculomegaly
- Usual onset: At conception
- Duration: Lifelong
- Causes: De novo mutations in the gene RNU4-2
- Diagnostic method: Genetic testing
- Differential diagnosis: RNU2-2 syndrome

RNU4-2 Syndrome or ReNU syndrome is a neurodevelopmental disorder caused by de novo variants in the human gene RNU4-2, which encodes an RNA component of the major spliceosome. It is characterized by hypotonia, global developmental delay, severely impaired intellectual development with poor or absent speech, delayed walking or inability to walk, feeding difficulties with poor overall growth, dysmorphic facial features, and brain anomalies, including ventriculomegaly.

The syndrome is an autosomal dominant genetic disorder caused by de novo variants in RNU4-2, a gene on chromosome 12, which encodes the small nuclear RNA (snRNA) U4. U4 is a component of the major spliceosome, a complex of proteins and non-coding RNAs that is necessary for RNA splicing. Most cases of RNU4-2 / ReNU syndrome are explained by a 1-bp insertion (n.64_65insT, NR_003137.2), which is thought to disrupt the interactions of snRNA U4 with the snRNA U6, affecting the stability of the ACAGAGA loop of U6 snRNA which binds 5' splice sites and induces splicing after U4-U6 unwinding. Disrupted splicing, in particular a change in 5' splice site usage, has been reported in individuals with variants in RNU4-2.

The genetic etiology of RNU4-2 / ReNU syndrome was identified independently by two research groups, both of which used data collected by Genomics England. The statisticians Daniel Greene and Ernest Turro at the Icahn School of Medicine at Mount Sinai, used a Bayesian approach to identify the genetic association. The other team involved a global collaboration led by Yuyang Chen and Nicola Whiffin of the University of Oxford.

Neurodevelopmental disorder with hypotonia, brain anomalies, distinctive facies, and absent language (NEDHAFA) was a suggested name for this syndrome, however, ReNU syndrome (pronounced 'renew') was chosen through a collaboration between researchers and the families of those impacted by variants in RNU4-2. The name symbolises that this diagnosis “renews” hope for a brighter future for all those affected.

== Etiologically related disorder ==
An etiologically related disorder RNU2-2 syndrome has been identified by Greene and Turro. RNU2-2 syndrome is a major spliceosome disorder with similar symptoms to RNU4-2 / ReNU syndrome but it is five times less prevalent.
