= P130 =

P130 may refer to:

- Nucleolar phosphoprotein p130
- Pottier P.130 Coccinelle, a French light aircraft
- Retinoblastoma-like protein 2
- TCG Bartın (P-130), a patrol boat of the Turkish Navy
- P130, a state regional road in Latvia
