= EAF family =

EAF

Identifiers
- Symbol: EAF
- Pfam: PF09816
- InterPro: IPR027093
Available protein structures:
- Pfam: structures / ECOD
- PDB: RCSB PDB; PDBe; PDBj
- PDBsum: structure summary

In molecular biology, the EAF family of proteins act as transcriptional transactivators of ELL and ELL2 RNA Polymerase II (Pol II) transcriptional elongation factors. EAF proteins form a stable heterodimer complex with ELL proteins to facilitate the binding of RNA polymerase II to activate transcription elongation. ELL and EAF1 are components of Cajal bodies, which have a role in leukemogenesis. EAF1 also has the capacity to interact with ELL1 and ELL2. The N terminus of approx 120 of EAF1 has a region of high serine, aspartic acid, and glutamic acid residues.
