= Small nucleolar RNA 775 =

- Predicted secondary structure and sequence conservation of Small nucleolar RNA 775

Identifiers
- Rfam: RF02705

Other data
- Domain: Eukaryota
- GO: GO:0005730,GO:0006396
- SO: SO:0000594
- PDB structures: PDBe

Small nucleolar RNA 775 (snoR775) is a snoRNAs, belonging to the H/ACA class.

== Location ==
SnoR775 was discovered in the promoter-based non-coding RNA identification study in Arabidopsis thaliana. Its name is based on its close proximity to micro RNA miR775. In fact the snoR775 and miR775 precursors are encoded by a single gene (named sno-miR775). This arrangement might have interesting functional and evolutionary consequences.

== See also ==
- TeloSII ncRNAs
