= U12 intron database =

U12DB

Content
- Description: orthologous U12-type spliceosomal introns.

Contact
- Authors: Tyler S Alioto
- Primary citation: Alioto & al. (2007)
- Release date: 2006

Access
- Website: https://genome.crg.cat/datasets/u12/

U12 Intron Database (U12DB) is a biological database of containing the sequence of eukaryotic introns that are spliced out by a specialised minor spliceosome that contains U12 minor spliceosomal RNA in place of U2 spliceosomal RNA. These U12-dependent introns are under-represented in genome annotations because they often have non canonical splice sites. Release 1 of the database contains 6,397 known and predicted U12-dependent introns across 20 species.
