= Coilin =

Protein found in humans

COIL

Identifiers
- Aliases: COIL, Coil, C79982, Cln80, p80, p80-coilin, coilin
- External IDs: OMIM: 600272; MGI: 104842; GeneCards: COIL

Gene location (Human)
| Chr. | Chromosome 17 (human) |
| Band | 17q22 | Start | 56,938,199 bp |
| Band | 17q22 | End | 56,961,050 bp |

Gene location (Mouse)
| Chr. | Chromosome 11 (mouse) |
| Band | 11 C|11 54.34 cM | Start | 88,861,078 bp |
| Band | 11 C|11 54.34 cM | End | 88,882,439 bp |
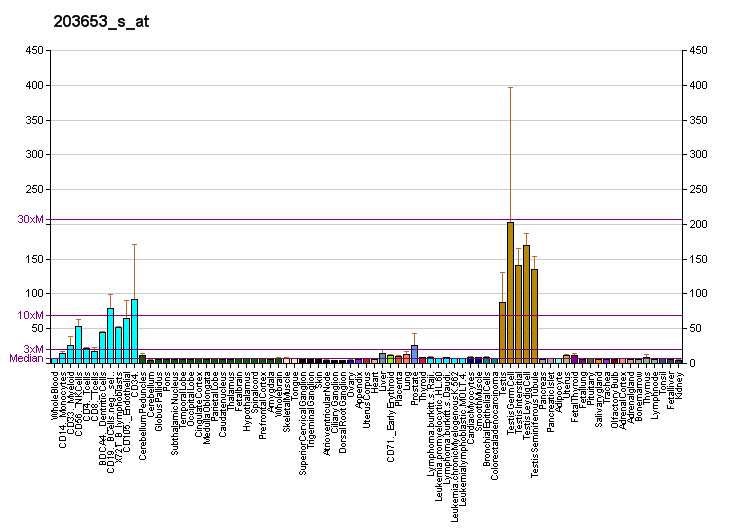

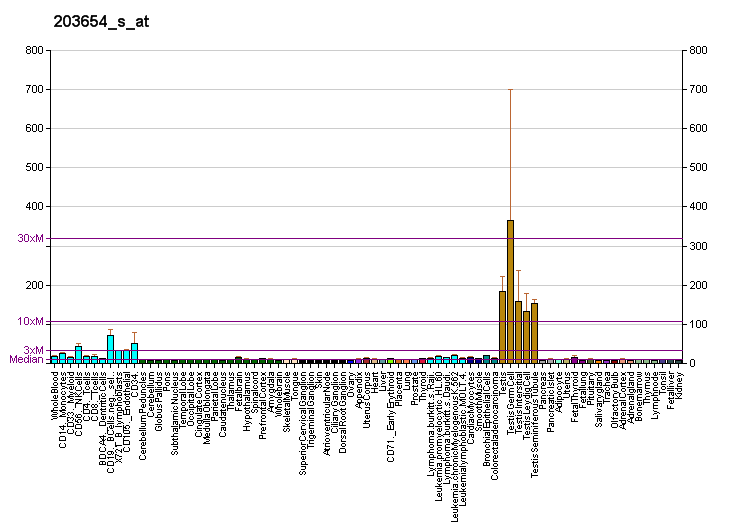
RNA expression pattern
| Bgee | Human / Mouse (ortholog); Top expressed in: sperm; buccal mucosa cell; left testis; right testis; hair follicle; tibia; germinal epithelium; parietal pleura; gingival epithelium; urethra / Top expressed in: spermatid; spermatocyte; seminiferous tubule; blastocyst; morula; mandibular prominence; maxillary prominence; primitive streak; epiblast; external carotid artery; More reference expression data |
| BioGPS | More reference expression data |
Gene ontology
| Molecular function | protein binding; identical protein binding; protein C-terminus binding; U1 snRNA binding; U2 snRNA binding |
| Cellular component | Cajal body; nucleolus; membrane; nucleus; nucleoplasm; fibrillar center; nuclear body |
| Biological process | spliceosomal snRNP assembly |
Sources:Amigo / QuickGO
Orthologs
| Databases | NCBI: entry; OMA: entry |
| Species | Human | Mouse |
| Entrez | 8161 | 12812 |
| Ensembl | ENSG00000121058 | ENSMUSG00000033983 |
| UniProt | P38432 | E9Q284 |
| RefSeq (mRNA) | NM_004645 | NM_016706 |
| RefSeq (protein) | NP_004636 | NP_057915 |
| Location (UCSC) | Chr 17: 56.94 – 56.96 Mb | Chr 11: 88.86 – 88.88 Mb |
| PubMed search |
- Wikidata
| View/Edit Human | View/Edit Mouse |

Coilin is a protein that in humans is encoded by the COIL gene. Coilin got its name from the coiled shape of the Cajal bodies in which it is found. It was first identified using human autoimmune serum.

== Function ==
Coilin protein is one of the main molecular components of Cajal bodies. Cajal bodies are non-membrane bound nuclear bodies of varying number and composition that are involved in the post-transcriptional modification of small nuclear and small nucleolar RNAs. In addition to its structural role, coilin acts as glue to connect the CB to the nucleolus. The N-terminus of the coilin protein directs its self-oligomerization while the C-terminus influences the number of nuclear bodies assembled per cell. Differential methylation and phosphorylation of coilin likely influences its localization among nuclear bodies and the composition and assembly of Cajal bodies. This gene has pseudogenes on chromosome 4 and chromosome 14.

To study CBs, coilin can be combined with GFP (Green Fluorescent Protein) to form Coilin-GFP hybrid protein. The hybrid protein can then be used to locate CBs underneath a microscope, usually near the nucleolus of the cell. Other proteins that make up the CB include snRNPs and nucleolar snoRNPs.

Coilin has been shown to interact with ataxin 1, nucleolar phosphoprotein p130, SMN, and SNRPB.
