= EAF1 =

Protein-coding gene in the species Homo sapiens

Identifiers
- Aliases: EAF1, ELL associated factor 1
- External IDs: OMIM: 608315; MGI: 1921677; HomoloGene: 12561; GeneCards: EAF1; OMA:EAF1 - orthologs

Gene location (Human)
Chr.	Chromosome 3 (human)
Band	3p25.1	Start	15,427,598 bp
Band	3p25.1	End	15,450,635 bp

Gene location (Mouse)
Chr.	Chromosome 14 (mouse)
Band	14|14 B	Start	31,216,356 bp
Band	14|14 B	End	31,231,815 bp
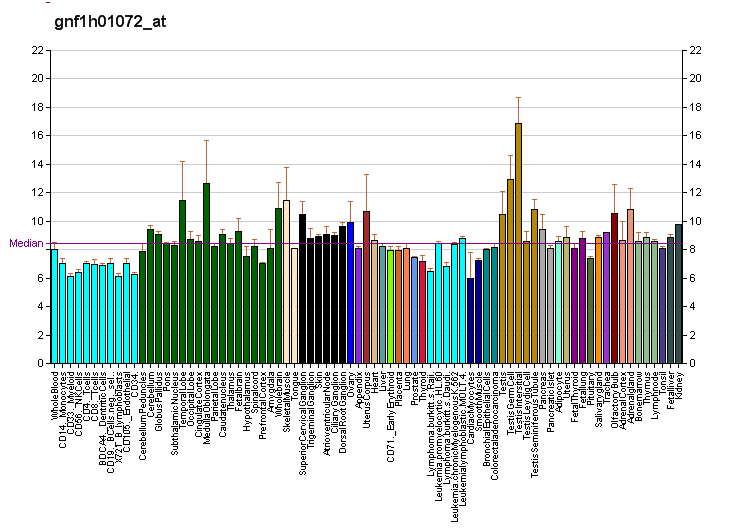
RNA expression pattern
Bgee	Human / Mouse (ortholog); Top expressed in: amniotic fluid; islet of Langerhans; decidua; monocyte; secondary oocyte; lower lobe of lung; palpebral conjunctiva; pancreatic epithelial cell; epithelium of nasopharynx; prefrontal cortex / Top expressed in: epithelium of lens; tail of embryo; olfactory epithelium; decidua; primitive streak; superior cervical ganglion; gastrula; thymus; genital tubercle; endothelial cell of lymphatic vessel; More reference expression data
BioGPS	More reference expression data
Gene ontology
Molecular function	protein binding
Cellular component	Cajal body; nuclear speck; transcription elongation factor complex; super elongation complex; intracellular membrane-bounded organelle; intercellular bridge; nucleus; nucleoplasm; nuclear body
Biological process	regulation of transcription, DNA-templated; transcription, DNA-templated; transcription by RNA polymerase II; transcription elongation from RNA polymerase II promoter
Sources:Amigo / QuickGO
Orthologs
Species	Human	Mouse
Entrez	85403	74427
Ensembl	ENSG00000144597	ENSMUSG00000021890
UniProt	Q96JC9	Q9D4C5
RefSeq (mRNA)	NM_033083	NM_028932
RefSeq (protein)	NP_149074	NP_083208
Location (UCSC)	Chr 3: 15.43 – 15.45 Mb	Chr 14: 31.22 – 31.23 Mb
PubMed search
- Wikidata
View/Edit Human	View/Edit Mouse

ELL-associated factor 1 is a protein that, in humans, is encoded by the EAF1 gene. It is part of the EAF family of proteins.
