= SNRPB =

Protein-coding gene in the species Homo sapiens

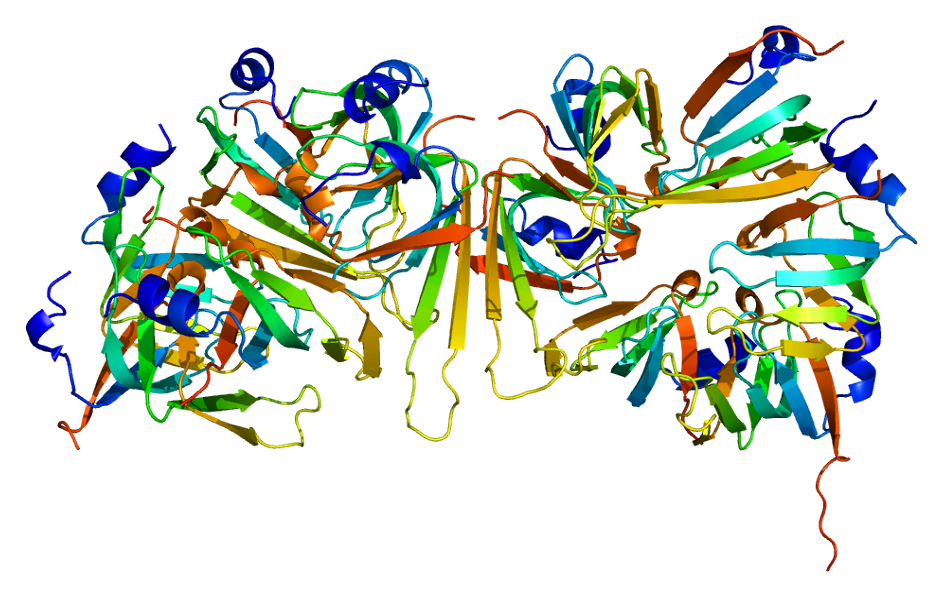

Identifiers
- Aliases: SNRPB, COD, SNRPB1, Sm-B/B', SmB/B', SmB/SmB', snRNP-B, CCMS, small nuclear ribonucleoprotein polypeptides B and B1
- External IDs: OMIM: 182282; MGI: 98342; GeneCards: SNRPB
Available structures
PDB	Ortholog search: PDBe RCSB
PDB	List of PDB id codes 1D3B, 3CW1, 3PGW, 4PJO, 4WZJ, 3JCR

Gene location (Human)
Chr.	Chromosome 20 (human)
Band	20p13	Start	2,461,634 bp
Band	20p13	End	2,470,853 bp

Gene location (Mouse)
Chr.	Chromosome 2 (mouse)
Band	2 F1|2 63.19 cM	Start	130,013,555 bp
Band	2 F1|2 63.19 cM	End	130,021,323 bp
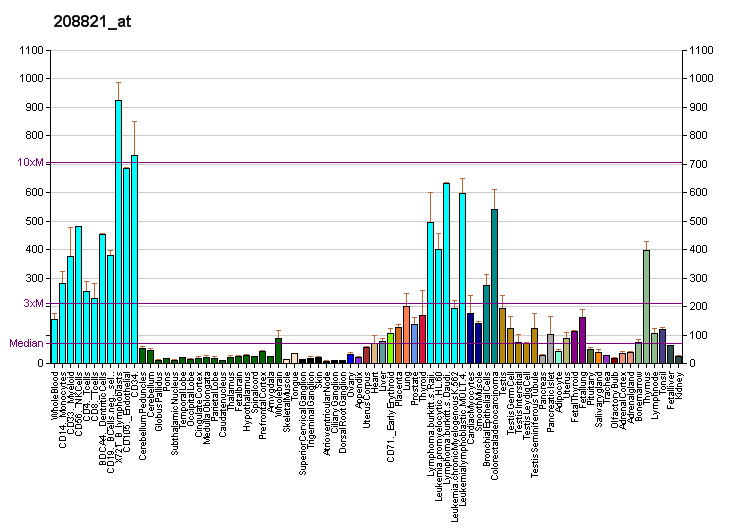

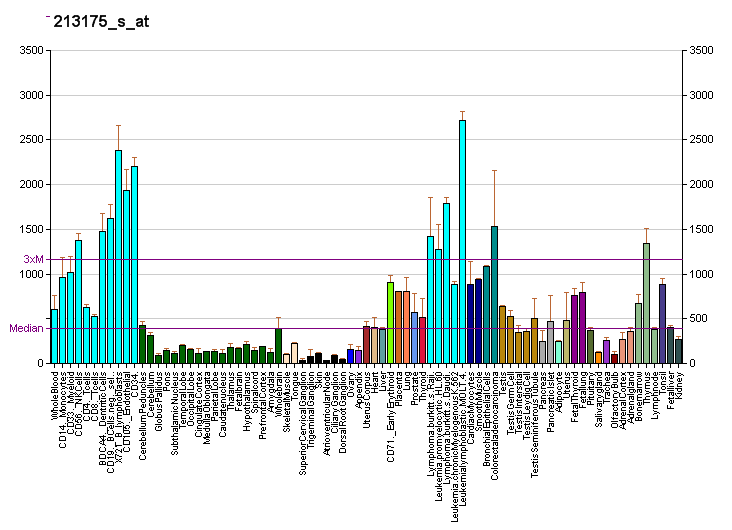
RNA expression pattern
Bgee	Human / Mouse (ortholog); Top expressed in: granulocyte; mucosa of transverse colon; mucosa of esophagus; skin of leg; skin of abdomen; thymus; left uterine tube; mucosa of pharynx; lymph node; gingival epithelium / Top expressed in: choroid plexus of fourth ventricle; somite; lactiferous gland; abdominal wall; mandibular prominence; maxillary prominence; primitive streak; entorhinal cortex; embryo; CA3 field; More reference expression data
BioGPS	More reference expression data
Gene ontology
Molecular function	histone pre-mRNA DCP binding; U2 snRNA binding; protein binding; telomerase RNA binding; RNA binding; U1 snRNP binding; U2 snRNP binding
Cellular component	cytoplasm; SMN-Sm protein complex; cytosol; catalytic step 2 spliceosome; U4/U6 x U5 tri-snRNP complex; histone pre-mRNA 3'end processing complex; U5 snRNP; U12-type spliceosomal complex; U2 snRNP; U1 snRNP; methylosome; U7 snRNP; small nuclear ribonucleoprotein complex; telomerase holoenzyme complex; spliceosomal complex; U4 snRNP; extracellular exosome; U2-type prespliceosome; nucleus; nucleoplasm; U2-type precatalytic spliceosome; U2-type catalytic step 2 spliceosome
Biological process	mRNA splicing, via spliceosome; termination of RNA polymerase II transcription; mRNA processing; spliceosomal snRNP assembly; RNA splicing; histone mRNA metabolic process; protein methylation; import into nucleus; brain development
Sources:Amigo / QuickGO
Orthologs
Databases	NCBI: entry; OMA: entry
Species	Human	Mouse
Entrez	6628	20638
Ensembl	ENSG00000125835	ENSMUSG00000027404
UniProt	P14678	P27048
RefSeq (mRNA)	NM_198216; NM_003091	NM_009225
RefSeq (protein)	NP_003082; NP_937859	NP_033251
Location (UCSC)	Chr 20: 2.46 – 2.47 Mb	Chr 2: 130.01 – 130.02 Mb
PubMed search
- Wikidata
View/Edit Human	View/Edit Mouse

Small nuclear ribonucleoprotein-associated proteins B and B' is a protein that in humans is encoded by the SNRPB gene.

== Function ==
The protein encoded by this gene is one of several nuclear proteins that are found in common among U1, U2, U4/U6, and U5 small ribonucleoprotein particles (snRNPs). These snRNPs are involved in pre-mRNA splicing, and the encoded protein may also play a role in pre-mRNA splicing or snRNP structure. Autoantibodies from patients with systemic lupus erythematosus frequently recognize epitopes on the encoded protein. Two transcript variants encoding different isoforms (B and B') have been found for this gene.

== Interactions ==
SNRPB has been shown to interact with DDX20 and Coilin.
