= RNU2-2 =

RNU2-2P

Identifiers
- Aliases: RNU2-2P, RNU2-2, RNU2B, U2, RNA, U2 small nuclear 2, pseudogene
- External IDs: GeneCards: RNU2-2P
Orthologs
Databases	NCBI: entry; OMA: entry
Species	Human	Mouse
Entrez	26855	n/a
Ensembl	ENSG00000222328	n/a
UniProt	n a	n/a
RefSeq (mRNA)	n/a	n/a
RefSeq (protein)	n/a	n/a
Location (UCSC)	n/a	n/a
PubMed search		n/a
- Wikidata
View/Edit Human

RNU2-2 is a snRNA gene that encodes one of the functional homologs of U2 spliceosomal RNA. RNU2-2 was previously thought to be a pseudogene, but it has been shown to be functional. Specific heterozygous variants in RNU2-2 cause an autosomal dominant developmental and epileptic encephalopathy, also called RNU2-2 syndrome.
