= Elongation factor for RNA polymerase II 2 =

Protein-coding gene in the species Homo sapiens

ELL2

Identifiers
- Aliases: ELL2, elongation factor for RNA polymerase II 2, MRCCAT1
- External IDs: OMIM: 601874; MGI: 2183438; GeneCards: ELL2
Available structures
PDB	Ortholog search: PDBe RCSB
PDB	List of PDB id codes 2E5N

Gene location (Human)
Chr.	Chromosome 5 (human)
Band	5q15	Start	95,885,098 bp
Band	5q15	End	95,961,851 bp

Gene location (Mouse)
Chr.	Chromosome 13 (mouse)
Band	13|13 C1	Start	75,854,876 bp
Band	13|13 C1	End	75,920,483 bp
RNA expression pattern
Bgee	Human / Mouse (ortholog); Top expressed in: parotid gland; mucosa of paranasal sinus; cartilage tissue; Achilles tendon; islet of Langerhans; pancreatic epithelial cell; gums; oral cavity; gingival epithelium; lower lobe of lung / Top expressed in: seminal vesicula; lacrimal gland; parotid gland; submandibular gland; molar; blood; epithelium of lens; epithelium of stomach; human fetus; body of femur; More reference expression data
BioGPS	n/a
Gene ontology
Molecular function	protein binding
Cellular component	nucleus; transcription elongation factor complex; nucleoplasm
Biological process	regulation of transcription, DNA-templated; transcription, DNA-templated; transcription elongation from RNA polymerase II promoter; snRNA transcription by RNA polymerase II
Sources:Amigo / QuickGO
Orthologs
Databases	NCBI: entry; OMA: entry
Species	Human	Mouse
Entrez	22936	192657
Ensembl	ENSG00000118985	ENSMUSG00000001542
UniProt	O00472	Q3UKU1
RefSeq (mRNA)	NM_012081	NM_138953
RefSeq (protein)	NP_036213	NP_620403
Location (UCSC)	Chr 5: 95.89 – 95.96 Mb	Chr 13: 75.85 – 75.92 Mb
PubMed search
- Wikidata
View/Edit Human	View/Edit Mouse

Elongation factor for RNA polymerase II 2 is a protein that in humans is encoded by the ELL2 gene.

The encoded protein is a component of the super elongation complex (SEC) and drives immunoglobulin synthesis in plasma cells. Sequence variation in ELL2 has been associated with multiple myeloma and altered immunoglobulin levels.
