= German submarine U-92 =

U-92 may refer to one of the following German submarines:

- SM U-92, a Type U 87 submarine launched in 1917 and that served in the First World War until sunk on 9 September 1918
  - During the First World War, Germany also had these submarines with similar names:
    - SM UB-92, a Type UB III submarine launched in 1918 and surrendered on 21 November 1918; broken up at Bo'ness in 1920–21
    - SM UC-92, a Type UC III submarine launched in 1918 and surrendered on 24 November 1918; dumped on beach at Falmouth after explosive trials 1921 and broken up in situ
- German submarine U-92 (1942), a Type VIIC submarine that served in the Second World War until damaged in an air attack on 4 October 1944; scrapped 1944–45
