= Nucleolar phosphoprotein p130 =

Protein-coding gene in the species Homo sapiens

NOLC1

Identifiers
- Aliases: NOLC1, NOPP130, NOPP140, NS5ATP13, P130, Nucleolar phosphoprotein p130, nucleolar and coiled-body phosphoprotein 1, Srp40
- External IDs: OMIM: 602394; MGI: 1918019; GeneCards: NOLC1

Gene location (Human)
Chr.	Chromosome 10 (human)
Band	10q24.32	Start	102,152,176 bp
Band	10q24.32	End	102,163,871 bp

Gene location (Mouse)
Chr.	Chromosome 19 (mouse)
Band	19|19 C3	Start	46,064,302 bp
Band	19|19 C3	End	46,073,969 bp
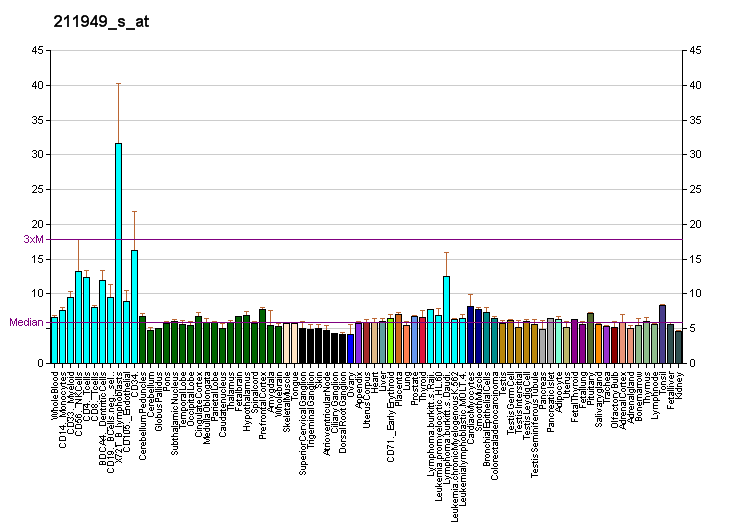

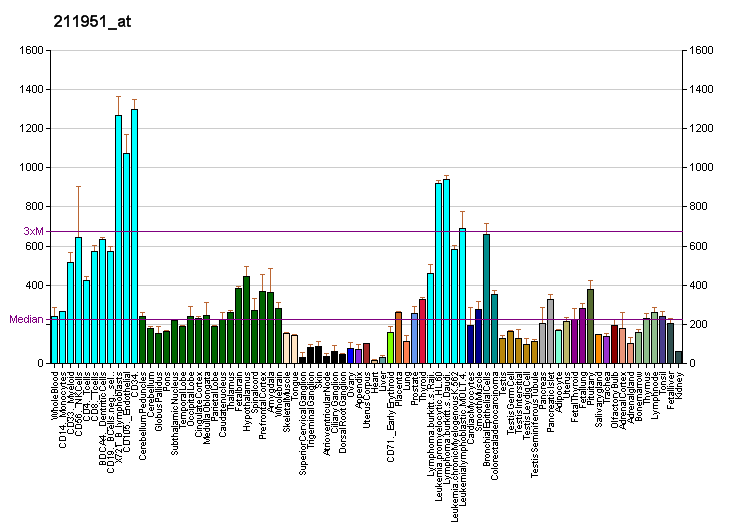

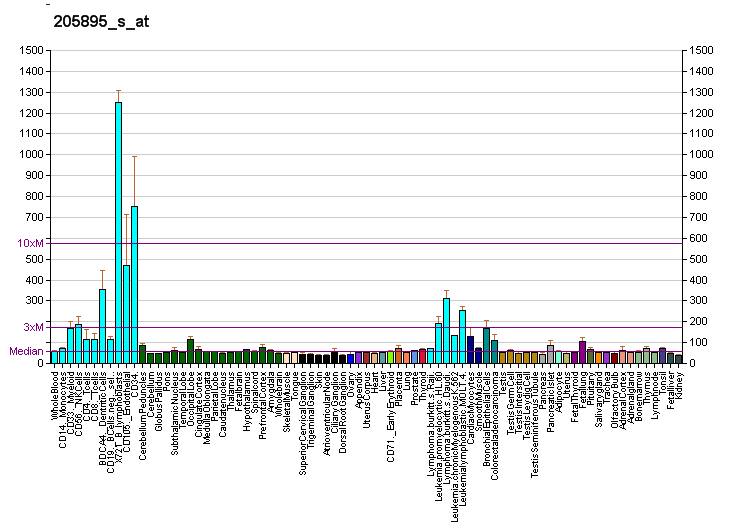
RNA expression pattern
Bgee	Human / Mouse (ortholog); Top expressed in: middle temporal gyrus; Brodmann area 23; germinal epithelium; parietal pleura; gingival epithelium; epithelium of nasopharynx; endothelial cell; pancreatic epithelial cell; visceral pleura; sperm / Top expressed in: morula; epiblast; primitive streak; tail of embryo; somite; embryo; yolk sac; embryo; mandibular prominence; maxillary prominence; More reference expression data
BioGPS	More reference expression data
Gene ontology
Molecular function	nucleotide binding; GTP binding; protein binding; ATP binding; RNA binding; RNA polymerase I core binding; protein heterodimerization activity; DNA binding; DNA-binding transcription factor activity; transcription factor binding; nuclear localization sequence binding; protein domain specific binding; box C/D RNA binding; box H/ACA snoRNA binding; box C/D snoRNP complex binding; box H/ACA snoRNP complex binding
Cellular component	cytoplasm; Cajal body; nucleus; nucleoplasm; nucleolus; fibrillar center; box C/D RNP complex; box H/ACA snoRNP complex
Biological process	rRNA processing; cell cycle; nucleolus organization; regulation of translation; neural crest formation; neural crest cell development; mitotic cell cycle; response to osmotic stress; positive regulation of cell population proliferation; box H/ACA RNA metabolic process; regulation of protein import into nucleus; positive regulation of transcription, DNA-templated
Sources:Amigo / QuickGO
Orthologs
Databases	NCBI: entry; OMA: entry
Species	Human	Mouse
Entrez	9221	70769
Ensembl	ENSG00000166197	ENSMUSG00000015176
UniProt	Q14978	E9Q5C9
RefSeq (mRNA)	NM_001284388; NM_001284389; NM_004741	NM_001039351; NM_001039352; NM_001039353; NM_053086
RefSeq (protein)	NP_001271317; NP_001271318; NP_004732	NP_001034440; NP_001034441; NP_001034442; NP_444316
Location (UCSC)	Chr 10: 102.15 – 102.16 Mb	Chr 19: 46.06 – 46.07 Mb
PubMed search
- Wikidata
View/Edit Human	View/Edit Mouse

Nucleolar phosphoprotein p130 is a protein that in humans is encoded by the NOLC1 gene.

== Interactions ==
Nucleolar phosphoprotein p130 has been shown to interact with coilin and CEBPB.
