= Yeast U1 spliceosomal RNA =

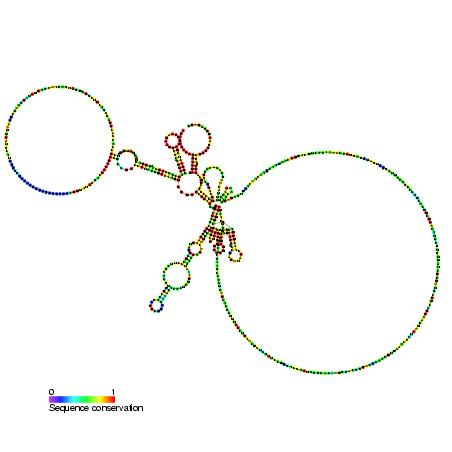
- Predicted secondary structure and sequence conservation of U1_yeast

Identifiers
- Symbol: U1_yeast
- Rfam: RF00488

Other data
- RNA type: Gene; snRNA; splicing
- Domain(s): Eukaryota
- GO: GO:0000368 GO:0030627 GO:0005685
- SO: SO:0000391
- PDB structures: PDBe

U1 is a small nuclear RNA (snRNA) component of the spliceosome and is involved in pre-mRNA splicing.

In the splicing process the 5' end of the U1 snRNA forms complementary base pairing with the 5' splice junction of the intron to be excised, thus defining the 5' donor site of an intron.

There are significant differences in sequence and secondary structure between metazoan and yeast U1 snRNAs, the latter being much longer (568 nucleotides as compared to 164 nucleotides in human). Nevertheless, secondary structure predictions suggest that all U1 snRNAs share a 'common core' consisting of helices I, II, the proximal region of III, and IV. The secondary structure model shows the structure prediction for the larger yeast sequences.
