= German submarine U-91 =

U-91 may refer to one of the following German submarines:

- SM U-91, a Type U 87 submarine launched in 1917 and that served in the First World War until surrendered on 26 November 1918; broken up at Brest in 1921
  - During the First World War, Germany also had these submarines with similar names:
    - SM UB-91, a Type UB III submarine launched in 1918 and surrendered on 21 November 1918; broken up at Briton Ferry in 1919–20
    - SM UC-91, a Type UC III submarine launched in 1918 and sunk on 10 January 1919 on way to surrender
- German submarine U-91 (1941), a Type VIIC submarine that served in the Second World War until sunk on 26 February 1944
