= RNU2-2 syndrome =

Neurodevelopmental disorder

- Specialty: Neurology
- Symptoms: Epilepsy, intellectual disability, autistic behavior, microcephaly, hypotonia, hyperventilation
- Duration: Lifelong
- Causes: Mutations in the RNU2-2 gene
- Diagnostic method: Genetic testing

RNU2-2 syndrome is a neurodevelopmental disorder caused by de novo variants in the human gene RNU2-2, which encodes an RNA component of the major spliceosome. It is characterized by epilepsy, intellectual disability, autistic behavior, microcephaly, hypotonia and hyperventilation. The disorder is also called autosomal dominant developmental and epileptic encephalopathy type 119 according to OMIM.

The syndrome is an autosomal dominant genetic disorder caused by de novo variants in RNU2-2, a gene on chromosome 11, which encodes the small nuclear RNA (snRNA) U2. U2 is a component of the major spliceosome, a complex of proteins and non-coding RNAs that is necessary for RNA splicing. Most cases of RNU2-2 syndrome are explained by the single nucleotide variants n.4G>A, n.35A>G, in roughly equal proportions. n.4G>A is thought to disrupt the interactions of snRNA U2 with the snRNA U6. n.35A>G is thought to disrupt the interaction of snRNA U2 with the 3′ branch sites of introns.

RNU2-2 syndrome was independently discovered by statisticians Daniel Greene and Ernest Turro at the Icahn School of Medicine at Mount Sinai, and by geneticists Adam Jackson and Siddharth Banka at the University of Manchester.
