= Small Cajal body-specific RNA =

Small Cajal body specific RNA 1
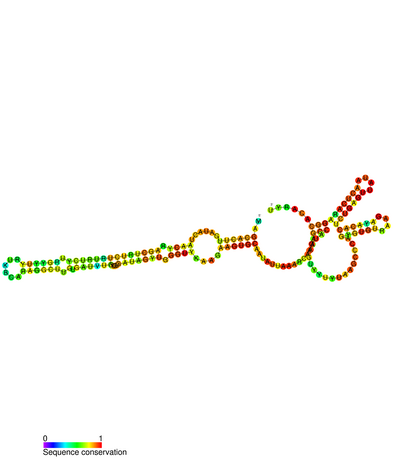
- Predicted secondary structure of Small Cajal body specific RNA 1

Identifiers
- Symbol: SCARNA1
- Rfam: RF00553

Other data
- RNA type: gene, snRNA, snoRNA, scaRNA;
- Domain: Vertebrata
- PDB structures: PDBe

Small Cajal body-specific RNAs (scaRNAs) are a class of small nucleolar RNAs (snoRNAs) that specifically localise to the Cajal body, a nuclear organelle (cellular sub-organelle) involved in the biogenesis of small nuclear ribonucleoproteins (snRNPs or snurps). ScaRNAs guide the modification (methylation and pseudouridylation) of RNA polymerase II transcribed spliceosomal RNAs U1, U2, U4, U5 and U12.

The first scaRNA identified was U85. It is unlike typical snoRNAs in that it is a composite C/D box and H/ACA box snoRNAs and can guide both pseudouridylation and 2′-O-methylation. Not all scaRNAs are composite C/D and H/ACA box snoRNA and most scaRNAs are structurally and functionally indistinguishable from snoRNAs, directing ribosomal RNA (rRNA) modification in the nucleolus.

== Drosophila scaRNAs ==
Several studies identified scaRNAs in Drosophila. One of the studies showed that several Drosophila scaRNAs could function equally well in the nucleoplasm of mutant flies that lack Cajal bodies. Further investigation showed that scaRNA pugU6-40 targets U6 snRNA, whose modification occurs in the nucleolus not CB and that pugU1-6 and pug U2-55 guide 2 RNAs: snRNA and 28s rRNA.

== Small Cajal body-specific RNA 1 ==
In molecular biology, Small Cajal body-specific RNA 1 (also known as SCARNA1 or ACA35) is a small nucleolar RNA found in Cajal bodies and believed to be involved in the pseudouridylation of U2 spliceosomal RNA at residue U89.

scaRNA1 is a non-coding RNA, which are functional products of genes not translated into proteins. Such RNA molecules usually contain important secondary structure or ligand-binding motifs and are involved in many important biological processes in the cell.

scaRNA1 belongs to the H/ACA box class of snoRNAs, as it has the predicted hairpin-hinge-hairpin-tail structure, conserved H/ACA-box motifs, and is found associated with GAR1 protein.
