= U12 minor spliceosomal RNA =

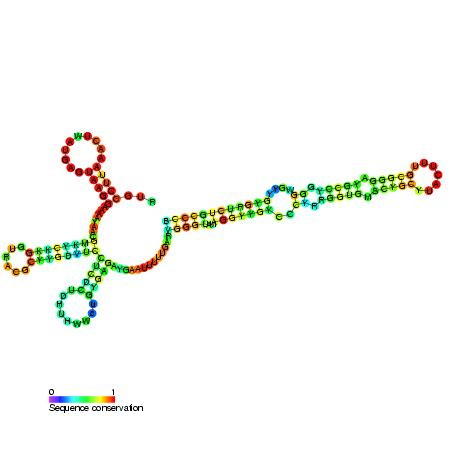
- Predicted secondary structure and sequence conservation of U12

Identifiers
- Symbol: U12
- Rfam: RF00007

Other data
- RNA type: Gene; snRNA; splicing
- Domain: Eukaryota
- GO: GO:0000371 GO:0045131 GO:0005693
- SO: SO:0000399
- PDB structures: PDBe

U12 minor spliceosomal RNA is a noncoding RNA that in humans is encoded by the RNU12 gene. The U12 small nuclear (snRNA), together with U4atac/U6atac, U5, and U11 snRNAs and associated proteins, forms the minor spliceosome that cleaves a divergent class of low-abundance pre-mRNA introns. Although the U12 sequence is very divergent from that of U2, the two are functionally analogous.

== Structure ==
The predicted secondary structure of U12 RNA is published,. However, the alternative single hairpin in the 3' end shown here seems to better match the alignment of divergent Drosophila melanogaster and Arabidopsis thaliana sequences. The sequences U12 introns that are spliced out are collected in a biological database called the U12 intron database.
