= U1 spliceosomal RNA =

- Predicted secondary structure and sequence conservation of U1

Identifiers
- Symbol: RNU1-1
- Alt. Symbols: U1, RNU1, RNU1A
- Rfam: RF00003

Other data
- RNA type: Gene; snRNA; splicing
- Domain: Eukaryota
- GO: GO:0000368 GO:0030627 GO:0005685
- SO: SO:0000391
- PDB structures: PDBe

U1 spliceosomal RNA is the small nuclear RNA (snRNA) component of U1 snRNP (small nuclear ribonucleoprotein), an RNA-protein complex that combines with other snRNPs, unmodified pre-mRNA, and various other proteins to assemble a spliceosome, a large RNA-protein molecular complex upon which splicing of pre-mRNA occurs. Splicing, or the removal of introns, is a major aspect of post-transcriptional modification, and takes place only in the nucleus of eukaryotes.

== Structure and function ==
In humans, the U1 spliceosomal RNA is 164 bases long, forms four stem-loops, and possesses a 5'-trimethylguanosine five-prime cap. Bases 3 to 10 are a conserved sequence that base-pairs with the 5' splice site of introns during RNA splicing, and bases 126 to 133 form the Sm site, around which the Sm ring is assembled. Stem-loop I binds to the U1-70K protein, stem-loop II binds to the U1 A protein, stem-loops III and IV bind to the core RNP domain, a heteroheptameric Sm ring consisting of SmB/B', SmD1/2/3, SmE, SmF, and SmG. U1 C interacts primarily through protein-protein interactions.

Experimentation has demonstrated that the binding of U1 snRNA to the 5'-splice site is necessary, but not sufficient, to begin spliceosome assembly. Following recruitment of the U2 snRNP and U5.U4/U6 tri-snRNP the spliceosome transfers the 5'-splice site from the U1 snRNA to U6 snRNA before splicing catalysis occurs.

There are significant differences in sequence and secondary structure between metazoan and yeast U1 snRNAs, the latter being much longer (568 nucleotides as compared to 164 nucleotides in humans). Nevertheless, secondary structure predictions suggest that all U1 snRNAs share a 'common core' consisting of helices I, II, the proximal region of III, and IV. This family does not contain the larger yeast sequences.

A non-canonical role for U1 snRNP has recently been described in the regulation of alternative polyA site selection It is proposed that increased transcription rates "sponge" U1 snRNP, decreasing its availability. This model is supported experimentally, as reducing U1 snRNP levels with antisense morpholino oligonucleotides led to a dose-dependent shift of polyA usage to generate shorter mRNA transcripts.

== Role in Disease ==
U1 snRNP has been implicated in many diseases, especially in those characterized by the presence of misfolded proteins. For instance, a protein component of U1 snRNP called U1-70k from the brain cells of healthy individuals was found to become insoluble in the presence of amyloid aggregates from the brain cells of patients with Alzheimer's disease. U1 overexpression elevates the expression level of autophagy and alters lysosomal biogenesis

Similarly in fibroblast cells of patients with a familial form of amyotrophic lateral sclerosis (ALS), the core components of U1 snRNP (namely, the Sm proteins and U1 snRNA) were found to co-mislocalize to the cytoplasm with the mutant version of a protein called FUS (ideally, FUS should localize to the nucleus since it possesses an exposed nuclear localization sequence). The authors of this study also found that experimentally knocking down U1 snRNP, lead to truncations in the axons of motor neurons, suggesting that splicing defects might have a role to play in ALS pathogenesis.

== Role in Genome-wide Telescripting ==
Telescripting is a process by which U1 snRNP suppresses premature cleavage and polyadenylation (PCPA) and allows large transcripts to be synthesized when needed in the cell. Introns possess what are called polyadenylation signals (PAS). These sites are where pre-mRNA can get terminated by cleavage and polyadenylation (a process termed PCPA). In addition to its role in 5' splice site recognition, U1 snRNP protects nascent transcripts by sheltering these exposed PAS in the pre-mRNA such that elongation can continue. Moreover, it has been found that U1 telescripting is particularly important for long-distance transcription elongation in introns of large genes that have a median size of 39 kilo base pairs.

== See also ==
- MicroRNA
- Small nuclear RNA
- U2 spliceosomal RNA
