= U4 spliceosomal RNA =

Non-coding RNA component of the spliceosome

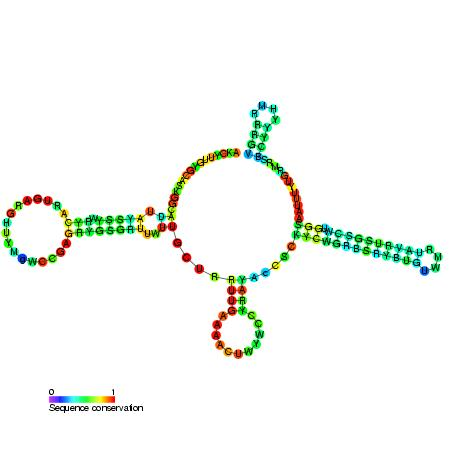
- Predicted secondary structure and sequence conservation of U4

Identifiers
- Symbol: RNU4-1
- Alt. Symbols: U4, U4BL, RNU4A, RNU4B2
- Rfam: RF00015

Other data
- RNA type: Gene; snRNA; splicing
- Domain: Eukaryota
- GO: GO:0017070 GO:0000353 GO:0000351 GO:0005687 GO:0046540
- SO: SO:0000393
- PDB structures: PDBe

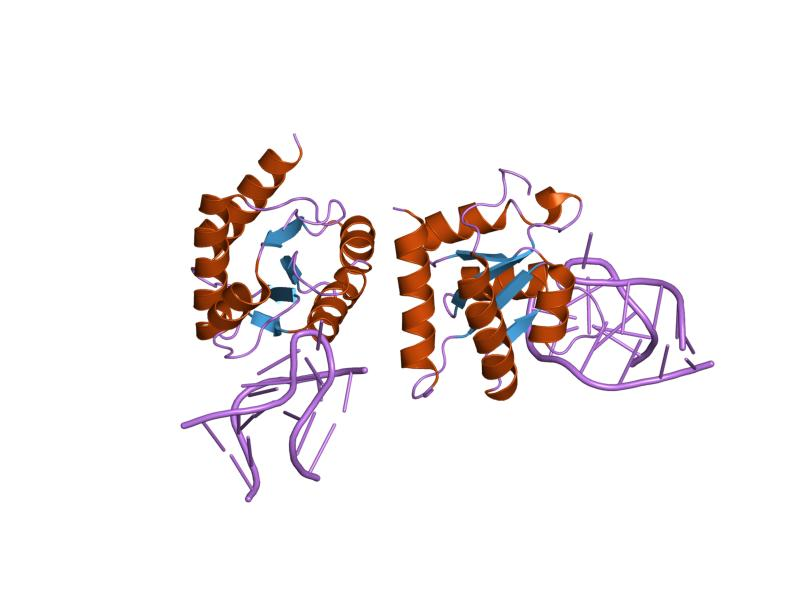
A 3D representation of a fragment of a U4 snRNA. The crystal structure of the spliceosomal 15.5KD protein is bound to a U4 snRNA fragment.

The U4 small nuclear Ribo-Nucleic Acid (U4 snRNA) is a non-coding RNA component of the major or U2-dependent spliceosome – a eukaryotic molecular machine involved in the splicing of pre-messenger RNA (pre-mRNA). It forms a duplex with U6, and with each splicing round, it is displaced from the U6 snRNA (and the spliceosome) in an ATP-dependent manner, allowing U6 to re-fold and create the active site for splicing catalysis. A recycling process involving protein Brr2 releases U4 from U6, while protein Prp24 re-anneals U4 and U6. The crystal structure of a 5′ stem-loop of U4 in complex with a binding protein has been solved.

== Biological role ==
The U4 snRNA has been shown to exist in a number of different formats including: bound to proteins as a small nuclear Ribo-Nuclear Protein snRNP, involved with the U6 snRNA in the di-snRNP, as well as involved with both the U6 snRNA and the U5 snRNA in the tri-snRNP. The different formats have been proposed to coincide with different temporal events in the activity of the penta-snRNP, or as intermediates in the step-wise model of spliceosome assembly and activity.

The U4 snRNA (and its likely analog snR14 in Yeast) has been shown not to participate directly in the specific catalytic activities of the splicing reaction, and is proposed instead to act as a regulator of the U6 snRNA. The U4 snRNA inhibits spliceosome activity during assembly by complementary base pairing between the U6 snRNA in two highly conserved stem regions. It is suggested that this base-pairing interaction prevents the U6 snRNA from assembling with the U2 snRNA into the conformation required for catalytic activity. If the U4 snRNA is degraded and thereby removed from the spliceosome, splicing is effectively halted. The U4 and U6 snRNAs are demonstratively required for splicing in vitro.

== Structure ==
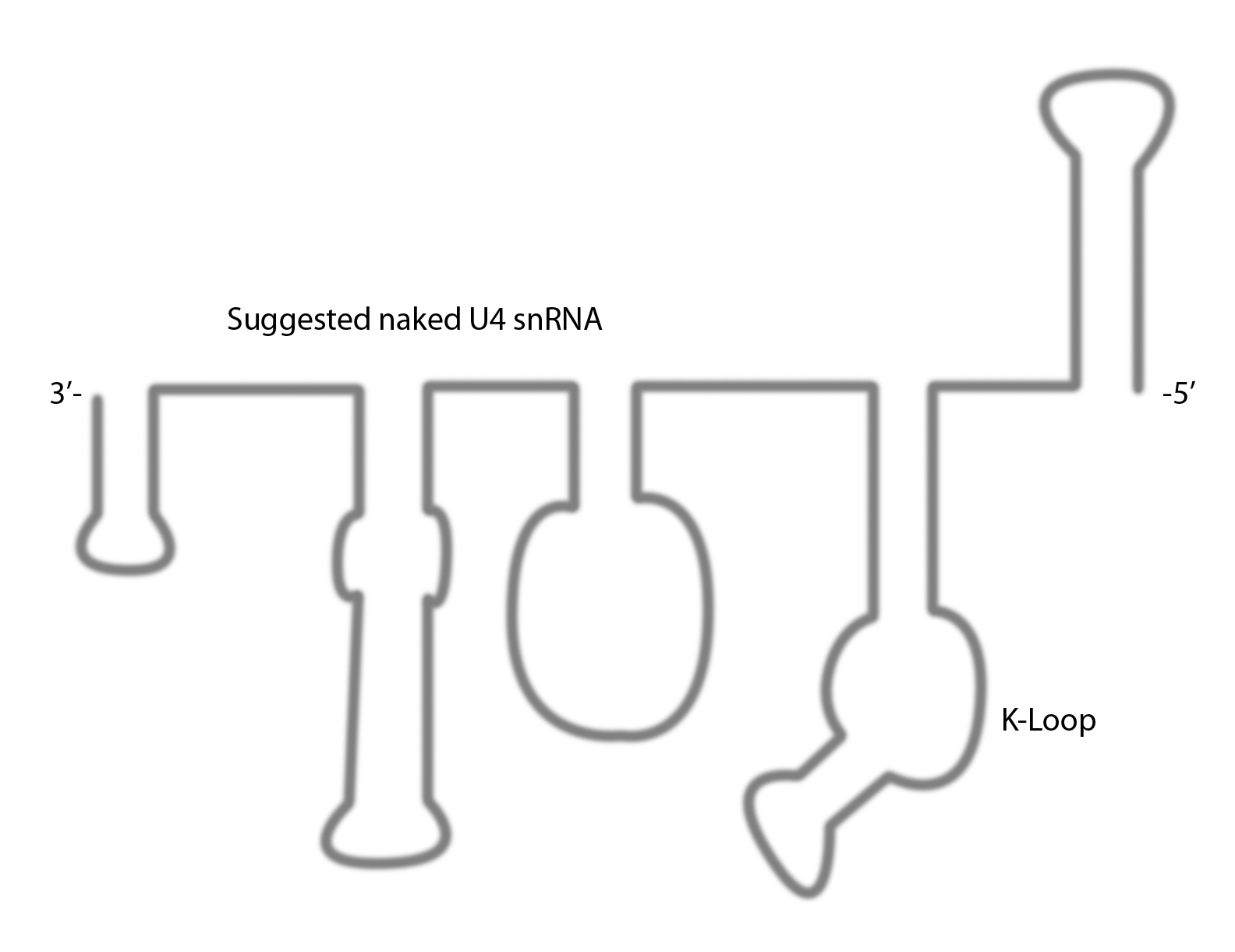
Figure 1. Naked U4 putative secondary structure.

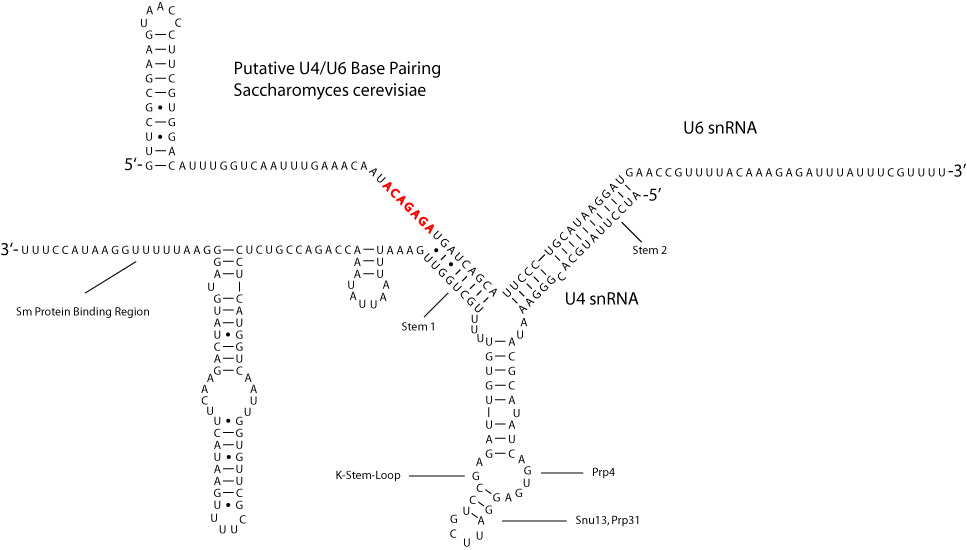
Figure 2. Putative U4/U6 base pairing secondary structure.

The U4 snRNA secondary structure is suggested to alter depending on its interaction with the U6 snRNA. Several experiments involving X-ray crystallography, NMR, and chemical modification RNA structure probing indicate that U4 snRNA secondary structure contains several conserved motifs, which serve structural as well as intermediary roles in establishing interactions with other splicing components. The putative U4/U6 snRNA base pairing secondary structure shown in Figure 2., is conserved across a diverse set of organisms suggesting the splicing machinery's ancient origins. It has been shown previously that a highly conserved Kinked-loop participates in specific protein interactions.

== Interactions ==
The U4 snRNA must be displaced from U6 snRNA in an ATP dependent process involving the protein Brr2 - before the spliceosome is made active. A cycle has been proposed including both Brr2 as well as the protein prp24 which selectively re-anneals U4 to the U6 snRNA. A ring of Sm proteins surround a conserved region of the U4 snRNA near the 3' end which are expected to promote favorable interactions between the different snRNPs as well as possibly protect the U4 snRNA from degradation by RNAse enzymes. Over 100 proteins have been identified that participate in spliceosomal pathway, several proteins of varying size are also known to interact with the U4 snRNP.
