= Cajal body =

Structures in cell nuclei

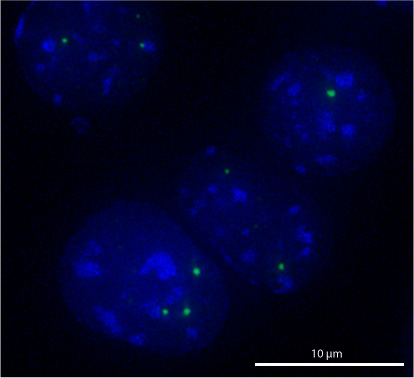
Nuclei of mouse cells (blue) containing Cajal bodies (green) visualized by fusion of p80/Coilin protein to GFP

Cajal bodies (CBs), also coiled bodies, are spherical nuclear bodies of 0.3–1.0 μm in diameter found in the nucleus of proliferative cells like embryonic cells and tumor cells, or metabolically active cells like neurons. CBs are membrane-less organelles and largely consist of proteins and RNA. They were first reported by Santiago Ramón y Cajal in 1903, who called them nucleolar accessory bodies due to their association with the nucleoli in neuronal cells. They were rediscovered with the use of the electron microscope (EM) and named coiled bodies, according to their appearance as coiled threads on EM images, and later renamed after their discoverer. Research on CBs was accelerated after discovery and cloning of the marker protein p80/Coilin. CBs have been implicated in RNA-related metabolic processes such as the biogenesis, maturation and recycling of snRNPs, histone mRNA processing and telomere maintenance. CBs assemble RNA which is used by telomerase to add nucleotides to the ends of telomeres.

== History ==
CBs were initially discovered by neurobiologist Santiago Ramón y Cajal in 1903 as small argyrophilic (readily stained by silver salts, literally "silver loving") spots in the nuclei of silver-stained neuronal cells. Because of their close association with nucleoli, he named them nucleolar accessory bodies. Later on, they were forgotten and rediscovered multiple times independently which led to a state where scientists from different research fields used different names for the same structure. Names used for CBs included "sphere organelles", "Binnenkörper", "nucleolar bodies" or "coiled bodies". The name coiled bodies comes from observation of electron microscopists Monneron and Bernhard. They described bodies as aggregates composed of coiled threads with thickness of 400–600 Å. When using higher magnification, they appear as tiny, 50 Å thick fibrils irregularly twisted along the axis of the threads. The bodies were even predicted to consist of ribonucleoproteins since treatment of cells with protease and RNase together, but not alone, caused dramatic changes to the structure of CBs.

== Localization ==
Cajal bodies are found in all eukaryotes that have been carefully studied. The cells in which Cajal bodies are most apparent usually demonstrate high levels of transcriptional activity, and are often dividing rapidly.

== Cell cycle ==
They are about 0.1–2.0 micrometres and are found one to five per nucleus. The number varies in different types of cells and over the cell cycle. Maximum number is reached in mid G_{1} phase and towards G_{2} they become larger and their number decreases. CBs disassemble during the M phase and reappear again later in G_{1} phase. Cajal bodies are possibly sites of assembly or modification of the transcription machinery of the nucleus.

== Functions ==
CBs are bound to the nucleolus by coilin proteins. P80-coilin is a specific marker for coiled bodies, and demonstrates these bodies tend to be associated with the nucleolus when cells are not dividing. CBs are associated with telomerase assembly and recruitment via a CAB-RNA sequence common in both CB RNAs (scaRNAs) and the RNA component of telomerase (TERC). TCAB1 recognizes the CAB sequence in both and recruits telomerase to the CBs.

CBs contain high concentrations of splicing small nuclear ribonucleoproteins (snRNPs), possibly indicating that they function to modify RNA after it has been transcribed from DNA. Experimental evidence indicates that CBs contribute to the biogenesis of enzyme telomerase, and assist in subsequent transport of telomerase to telomeres.
