= U5 spliceosomal RNA =

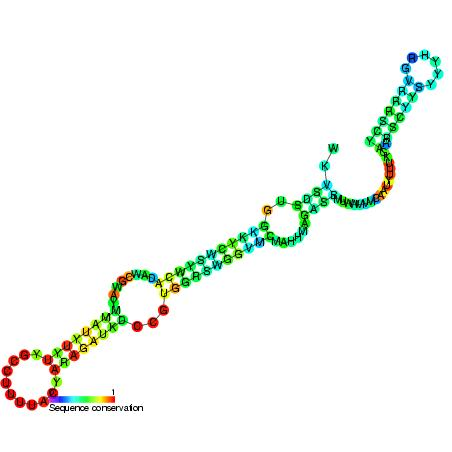
- Predicted secondary structure and sequence conservation of U5

Identifiers
- Symbol: U5
- Rfam: RF00020

Other data
- RNA type: Gene; snRNA; splicing
- Domain: Eukaryota
- GO: GO:0000351 GO:0000353 GO:0005682 GO:0046540
- SO: SO:0000395
- PDB structures: PDBe

U5 snRNA is a small nuclear RNA (snRNA) that participates in RNA splicing as a component of the spliceosome. It forms the U5 snRNP (small nuclear ribonucleoprotein) by associating with several proteins including Prp8 - the largest and most conserved protein in the spliceosome, Brr2 - a helicase required for spliceosome activation, Snu114, and the 7 Sm proteins. U5 snRNA forms a coaxially-stacked series of helices that project into the active site of the spliceosome. Loop 1, which caps this series of helices, forms 4-5 base pairs with the 5'-exon during the two chemical reactions of splicing. This interaction appears to be especially important during step two of splicing, exon ligation.

Multiple genes have been found to code for U5-type RNAs in humans, including RNU5A-1, RNU5B-1, RNU5D-1, and RNU5F-1.

== Medical relevance ==
Specific heterozygous variants in RNU5B-1 (previously RNU5B), a gene that encodes one of the functional homologs of U5 spliceosomal RNA in humans, cause an autosomal dominant Neurodevelopmental disorder with seizures and joint laxity (OMIM 621090) also called RNU5B-1 syndrome.
