= LSm proteins =

Family of RNA-binding proteins

LSM domain
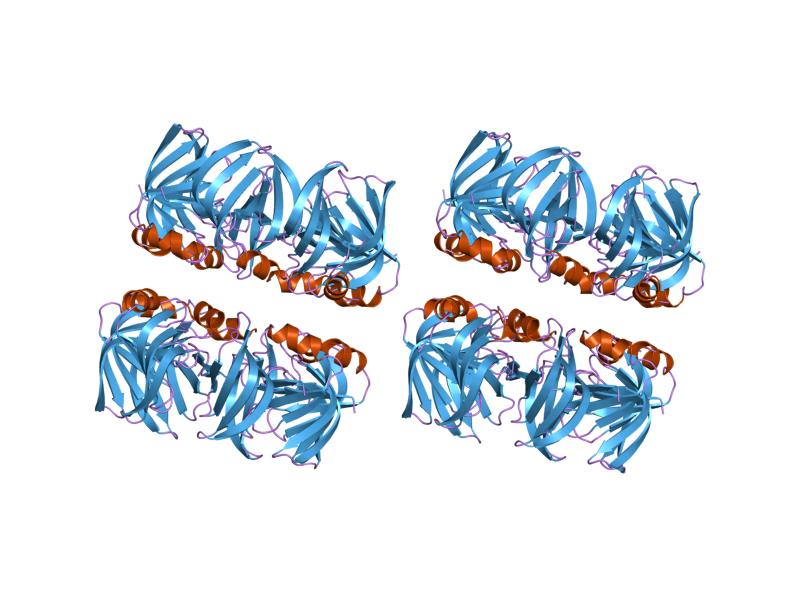
- crystal structure of the sm-related protein of P. abyssi the biological unit is a heptamer

Identifiers
- Symbol: LSM
- Pfam: PF01423
- InterPro: IPR001163
- SCOP2: 1d3b / SCOPe / SUPFAM
- CDD: cd00600
Available protein structures:
- PDB: IPR001163 PF01423 (ECOD; PDBsum)
- AlphaFold: IPR001163; PF01423

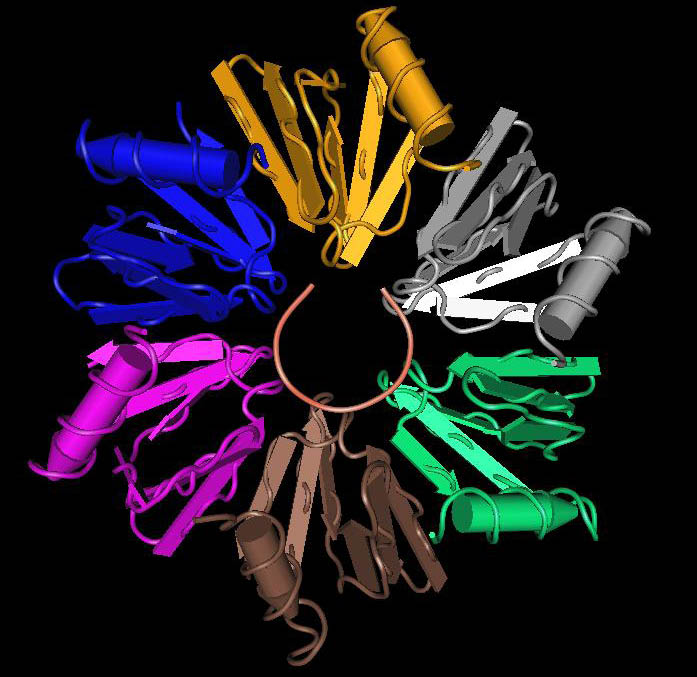
The LSm protein Hfq hexamer torus showing the peptide backbone, with each protein in a different color, representing each beta strand as a ribbon, each alpha helix as a cylinder and the RNA oligonucleotide as a 300° arc

The Sm family comprises related RNA-binding proteins found in eukaryotes, archaea and bacteria. It includes the canonical Sm proteins and the related LSm proteins (short for "like Sm") in eukaryotes, the Sm-like archaeal proteins and the bacterial protein Hfq. Members share a characteristic three-dimensional structure called the Sm fold and assemble into rings of six or seven subunits that bind RNA.

In eukaryotes, canonical Sm rings and the Lsm2–8 ring form the cores of different small nuclear ribonucleoproteins involved in pre-mRNA splicing, while the Lsm1–7 ring promotes mRNA decay. In bacteria, Hfq helps small regulatory RNAs pair with their target mRNAs, affecting translation and mRNA stability. The Sm proteins were named after Stephanie Smith, a patient with systemic lupus erythematosus whose antibodies were used to identify them.

== Structure ==
=== Sm fold ===
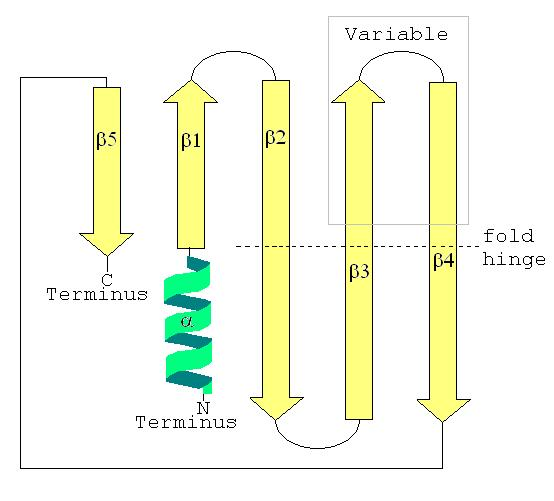
LSm secondary structure showing the N-terminal alpha helix and the five-strand antiparallel beta sheet

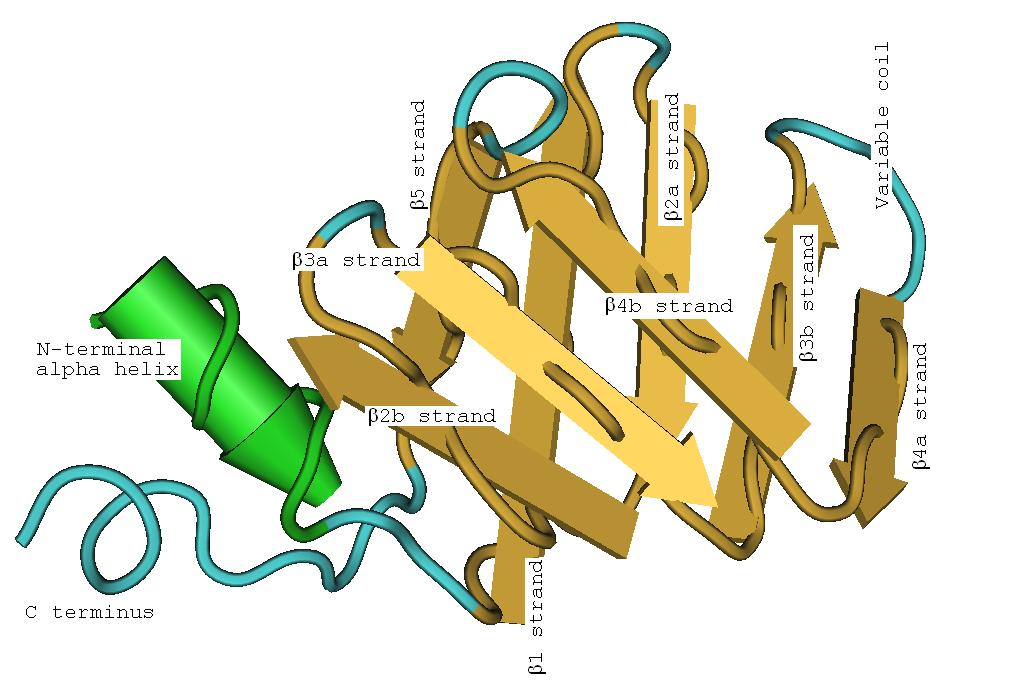
The LSm protein Human SmD1 showing the eight-strand beta sandwich peptide backbone description. (The beta sheet fold hinge runs along the bottom of the image.)

Uridine phosphate binds in archaeal Sm1 between the β2b/β3a loop and β4b/β5 loop. The uracil is stacked between the histidine and arginine residues, stabilized by hydrogen bonding to an asparagine residue, and hydrogen bonding between the aspartate residue and the ribose. LSm proteins are characterized by a beta sheet (the secondary structure), folded into the LSm fold (the tertiary structure), polymerization into a six or seven member torus (the quaternary structure), and binding to RNA oligonucleotides.

==== Secondary ====
The secondary structure of a LSm protein is a small five-strand anti-parallel beta sheet, with the strands identified from the N-terminal end to the C-terminal end as β1, β2, β3, β4, β5. The SCOP class of All beta proteins and the CATH class of Mainly Beta are defined as protein structures that are primarily beta sheets, thus including LSm. The SM1 sequence motif corresponds to the β1, β2, β3 strands, and the SM2 sequence motif corresponds to the β4 and β5 strands. The first four beta strands are adjacent to each other, but β5 is adjacent to β1, turning the overall structure into a short barrel. This structural topology is described as 51234. A short (two to four turns) N-terminal alpha helix is also present in most LSm proteins. The β3 and β4 strands are short in some LSm proteins, and are separated by an unstructured coil of variable length. The β2, β3 and β4 strands are strongly bent about 120° degrees at their midpoints The bends in these strands are often glycine, and the side chains internal to the beta barrel are often the hydrophobic residues valine, leucine, isoleucine and methionine.

==== Tertiary ====
SCOP simply classifies the LSm structure as the Sm-like fold, one of 149 different Beta Protein folds, without any intermediate groupings. The LSm beta sheet is sharply bent and described as a Roll architecture in CATH (one of 20 different beta protein architectures in CATH). One of the beta strands (β5 in LSm) crosses the open edge of the roll to form a small SH3 type barrel topology (one of 33 beta roll topologies in CATH). CATH lists 23 homologous superfamilies with an SH3 type barrel topology, one of which is the LSm structure (RNA Binding Protein in the CATH system). SCOP continues its structural classification after Fold to Superfamily, Family and Domain, while CATH continues to Sequence Family, but these divisions are more appropriately described in the "Evolution and phylogeny" section.

The SH3-type barrel tertiary structure of the LSm fold is formed by the strongly bent (about 120°) β2, β3 and β4 strands, with the barrel structure closed by the β5 strand. Emphasizing the tertiary structure, each bent beta strand can be described as two shorter beta strands. The LSm fold can be viewed as an eight-strand anti-parallel beta sandwich, with five strands in one plane and three strands in a parallel plane with about a 45° pitch angle between the two halves of the beta sandwich. The short (two to four turns) N-terminal alpha helix occurs at one edge of the beta sandwich. This alpha helix and the beta strands can be labeled (from the N-terminus to the C-terminus) α, β1, β2a, β2b, β3a, β3b, β4a, β4b, β5 where the a and b refer to either the two halves of a bent strand in the five-strand description, or to the individual strands in the eight-strand description. Each strand (in the eight-strand description) is formed from five amino acid residues. Including the bends and loops between the strands, and the alpha helix, about 60 amino acid residues contribute to the LSm fold, but this varies between homologs due to variation in inter-strand loops, the alpha helix, and even the lengths of β3b and β4a strands.

=== Multidomain Sm-like proteins ===
The LSm12–16 groups share an N-terminal LSm domain and differ in their C-terminal regions. LSm16 proteins, for example, contain a YjeF_N domain, and a putative methyltransferase domain was identified in one LSm12 protein. Ataxin-2 contains an N-terminal LSm domain followed by an LSm-associated domain (LSmAD).

=== Ring assembly ===
LSm proteins typically assemble into a LSm ring, a six or seven member torus, about 7 nanometers in diameter with a 2 nanometer hole. The ancestral condition is a homohexamer or homoheptamer of identical LSm subunits. LSm proteins in eukaryotes form heteroheptamers of seven different LSm subunits, such as the Sm proteins. Binding between the LSm proteins is best understood with the eight-strand description of the LSm fold. The five-strand half of the beta sandwich of one subunit aligns with the three-strand half of the beta sandwich of the adjacent subunit, forming a twisted 8-strand beta sheet Aβ4a/Aβ3b/Aβ2a/Aβ1/Aβ5/Bβ4b/Bβ3a/Bβ2b, where the A and B refer to the two different subunits. In addition to hydrogen bonding between the Aβ5 and Bβ4b beta strands of the two LSm protein subunits, there are energetically favorable contacts between hydrophobic amino acid side chains in the interior of the contact area, and energetically favorable contacts between hydrophilic amino acid side chains around the periphery of the contact area.

=== RNA binding ===
LSm rings form ribonucleoprotein complexes with RNA oligonucleotides that vary in binding strength from very stable complexes (such as the Sm class snRNPs) to transient complexes. RNA oligonucleotides generally bind inside the hole (lumen) of the LSm torus, one nucleotide per LSm subunit, but additional nucleotide binding sites have been reported at the top (α helix side) of the ring. The exact chemical nature of this binding varies, but common motifs include stacking the heterocyclic base (often uracil) between planar side chains of two amino acids, hydrogen bonding to the heterocyclic base and/or the ribose, and salt bridges to the phosphate group.

== Function ==
The various kinds of LSm rings function as scaffolds or chaperones for RNA oligonucleotides, assisting the RNA to assume and maintain the proper three-dimensional structure. In some cases, this allows the oligonucleotide RNA to function catalytically as a ribozyme. In other cases, this facilitates modification or degradation of the RNA, or the assembly, storage, and intracellular transport of ribonucleoprotein complexes.

=== Bacterial ===
Several proteins with an LSm domain have been identified in Bacteria. Hfq protein forms homohexamer rings, and was originally discovered as necessary for infection by the bacteriophage Qβ, although this is clearly not the native function of this protein in bacteria. It is not universally present in all bacteria, but has been found in Pseudomonadota, Bacillota, Spirochaetota, Thermotogota, Aquificota, and one species of Archaea. (This last instance is probably a case of horizontal gene transfer.) Hfq is pleiotropic with a variety of interactions, generally associated with translation regulation. These include blocking ribosome binding to mRNA, marking mRNA for degradation by binding to their poly-A tails, and association with bacterial small regulatory RNAs (such as DsrA RNA) that control translation by binding to certain mRNAs. A second bacterial LSm protein is YlxS (sometimes also called YhbC), which was first identified in the soil bacterium Bacillus subtilis. This is a two-domain protein with a N-terminal LSm domain. Its function is unknown, but amino acid sequence homologs are found in virtually every bacterial genome to date, and it may be an essential protein. The middle domain of the small conductance mechanosensitive channel MscS in Escherichia coli forms a homoheptameric ring. This LSm domain has no apparent RNA-binding function, but the homoheptameric torus is part of the central channel of this membrane protein.

=== Archaeal ===
Sm1 and Sm2 are Sm-like proteins found in Archaea. They are also called SmAP1 and SmAP2, respectively, to distinguish them from the Sm1 and Sm2 sequence motifs. Sm1 and Sm2 generally form homoheptamer rings, although homohexamer rings have been observed. Sm1 rings are similar to eukaryote Lsm rings in that they form in the absence of RNA while Sm2 rings are similar to eukaryote Sm rings in that they require uridine-rich RNA for their formation. They have been reported to associate with RNase P RNA, suggesting a role in transfer RNA processing, but their function in archaea in this process (and possibly processing other RNA such as ribosomal RNA) is mostly unknown. One of the two main branches of archaea, the crenarchaeotes have a third known type of archaeal LSm protein, Sm3. This is a two-domain protein with a N-terminal LSm domain that forms a homoheptamer ring. Nothing is known about the function of this LSm protein, but presumably it interacts with, and probably helps process, RNA in these organisms.

=== Eukaryotes ===
==== Spliceosomal snRNPs ====
===== Sm ring =====
The Sm ring is found in the nucleus of all eukaryotes (about 2.5 million copies per proliferating human cell), and has the best understood functions. The Sm ring is a heteroheptamer. The Sm-class snRNA molecule (in the 5' to 3' direction) enters the lumen (doughnut hole) at the SmE subunit and proceeds sequentially in a clockwise fashion (looking from the α helix side) inside the lumen (doughnut hole) to the SmG, SmD3, SmB, SmD1, SmD2 subunits, exiting at the SmF subunit. (SmB can be replaced by the splice variant SmB' and by SmN in neural tissues.) The Sm ring permanently binds to the U1, U2, U4 and U5 snRNAs which form four of the five snRNPs that constitute the major spliceosome. The Sm ring also permanently binds to the U11, U12 and U4atac snRNAs which form four of the five snRNPs (including the U5 snRNP) that constitute the minor spliceosome. Both of these spliceosomes are central RNA-processing complexes in the maturation of messenger RNA from pre-mRNA. Sm proteins have also been reported to be part of ribonucleoprotein component of telomerase.

===== Lsm2–8 ring =====
The Lsm2–8 ring forms the protein core of the U6 snRNP of the major spliceosome and the U6atac snRNP of the minor spliceosome.

In budding yeast (Saccharomyces cerevisiae), the subunit order around the ring is Lsm2–Lsm3–Lsm6–Lsm5–Lsm7–Lsm4–Lsm8. Four successive uridines in an unphosphorylated U6 3′ fragment contact Lsm4, Lsm8, Lsm2 and Lsm3 along the inner rim in 5′-to-3′ order. In mature U6 RNA, the terminal uridine and its 3′ phosphate occupy a pocket formed by Lsm2, Lsm3 and Lsm8, and the penultimate uridine binds Lsm3.

Lsm2–8 stabilizes U6 RNA and promotes its pairing with U4. U6 RNA forms much of the major spliceosome’s catalytic core. Nuclear Lsm proteins have also been implicated in yeast precursor rRNA and tRNA processing.

===== Gemin6 and gemin7 =====
The SMN complex (described under "Biogenesis of snRNPs") is composed of the SMN protein and Gemin2-8. Two of these, Gemin 6 and Gemin7 have been discovered to have the LSm structure, and to form a heterodimer. These may have a chaperone function in the SMN complex to assist the formation of the Sm ring on the Sm-class snRNAs. PRMT5 complex is composed of PRMT5, pICln, WD45 (Mep50). pICln helps to form Sm opened ring on SMN complex. SMN complex assists in the assembly of snRNPs where the Sm ring is in the open conformation on SMN complex and this Sm ring is loaded onto the snRNA by SMN complex.

==== mRNA decay ====
A second type of Lsm ring is the Lsm1-7 ring, which has the same structure as the Lsm2-8 ring except that LSm1 replaces LSm8. In contrast to the Lsm2-8 ring, the Lsm1-7 ring localizes in the cytoplasm where it assists in degrading messenger RNA in ribonucleoprotein complexes. This process controls the turnover of messenger RNA so that ribosomal translation of mRNA to protein responds quickly to changes in transcription of DNA to messenger RNA by the cell. LSM1-7, together with Pat1, has been shown to play a role in the formation of P-bodies after deadenylation.

The Sm-like proteins Edc3 (LSm16) and LSm14A also participate in messenger RNA decapping, the removal of the 5′ cap during mRNA decay.

==== Histone mRNA processing ====
A second type of Sm ring exists where LSm10 replaces SmD1 and LSm11 replaces SmD2. LSm11 is a two domain protein with the C-terminal domain being a LSm domain. This heteroheptamer ring binds with the U7 snRNA in the U7 snRNP. The U7 snRNP mediates processing of the 3' UTR stem-loop of the histone mRNA in the nucleus. Like the Sm ring, it is assembled in the cytoplasm onto the U7 snRNA by a specialized SMN complex.

==== Calcium signaling ====
LSm12 binds the second messenger nicotinic acid adenine dinucleotide phosphate (NAADP) through its LSm domain. This interaction mediates NAADP-dependent activation of endolysosomal two-pore channels, releasing Ca^{2+} from acidic intracellular stores.

== Evolution ==
LSm homologs are found in all three domains of life, and may even be found in every single organism. Computational phylogenetic methods are used to infer phylogenetic relations. Sequence alignment between the various LSm homologs are the appropriate tool for this, such as multiple sequence alignment of the primary structure (amino acid sequence), and structural alignment of the tertiary structure (three-dimensional structure). It is hypothesized that a gene for a LSm protein was present in the last universal ancestor of all life. Based on the functions of known LSm proteins, this original LSm protein may have assisted ribozymes in the processing of RNA for synthesizing proteins as part of the RNA world hypothesis of early life. According to this view, this gene was passed from ancestor to descendant, with frequent mutations, gene duplications and occasional horizontal gene transfers. In principle, this process can be summarized in a phylogenetic tree with the root in the last universal ancestor (or earlier), and with the tips representing the universe of LSm genes existing today.

=== Bacterial and archaeal homologs ===
Based on structure, the known LSm proteins divide into a group consisting of the bacterial LSm proteins (Hfq, YlxS and MscS) and a second group of all other LSm proteins, in accordance with the most recently published phylogenetic trees. The three archaeal LSm proteins (Sm1, Sm2 and Sm3) also cluster as a group, distinct from the eukaryote LSm proteins. Both the bacterial and archaeal LSm proteins polymerize to homomeric rings, which is the ancestral condition.

=== Eukaryotic diversification ===
A series of gene duplications of a single eukaryote LSm gene resulted in most (if not all) of the known eukaryote LSm genes. Each of the seven Sm proteins has greater amino acid sequence homology to a corresponding Lsm protein than to the other Sm proteins. This suggests that an ancestral LSm gene duplicated several times, resulting in seven paralogs. These subsequently diverged from each other so that the ancestral homoheptamer LSm ring became a heteroheptamer ring. Based on the known functions of LSm proteins in eukaryotes and archaea, the ancestral function may have been processing of pre-ribosomal RNA, pre-transfer RNA, and pre-RNase P. Then, according to this hypothesis, the seven ancestral eukaryote LSm genes duplicated again to seven pairs of Sm/LSm paralogs; LSm1/SmB, LSm2/SmD1, LSm3/SmD2, LSm4/SmD3, LSm5/SmE, LSm6/SmF and LSm7/SmG. These two group of seven LSm genes (and the corresponding two kinds of LSm rings) evolved to an Sm ring (requiring RNA) and a Lsm ring (which forms without RNA). The LSm1/LSm8 paralog pair also seems to have originated prior to the last common eukaryote ancestor, for a total of at least 15 LSm protein genes. The SmD1/LSm10 paralog pair and the SmD2/LSm11 paralog pair exist only in animals, fungi, and the amoebozoa (sometimes identified as the unikont clade) and appears to be absent in the bikont clade (chromalveolates, excavates, plants and rhizaria). Therefore, these two gene duplications predated this fundamental split in the eukaryote lineage. The SmB/SmN paralog pair is seen only in the placental mammals, which dates this LSm gene duplication.

== Biogenesis ==
Small nuclear ribonucleoproteins (snRNPs) assemble in a tightly orchestrated and regulated process that involves both the cell nucleus and cytoplasm.

== Discovery ==
=== Smith antigen ===
The story of the discovery of the first LSm proteins begins with a young woman, Stephanie Smith, who was diagnosed in 1959 with systemic lupus erythematosus (SLE), eventually succumbing to complications of the disease in 1969 at the age of 22. During this period, she was treated at New York's Rockefeller University Hospital, under the care of Dr. Henry Kunkel and Dr. Eng Tan. As those with an autoimmune disease, SLE patients produce antibodies to antigens in their cells' nuclei, most frequently to their own DNA. However, Kunkel and Tan found in 1966 that Smith produced antibodies to a set of nuclear proteins, which they named the 'smith antigen' (Sm Ag). About 30% of SLE patients produce antibodies to these proteins, as opposed to double stranded DNA. This discovery improved diagnostic testing for SLE, but the nature and function of this antigen was unknown.

=== Link to pre-mRNA splicing ===
Research continued during the 1970s and early 1980s. The smith antigen was found to be a complex of ribonucleic acid (RNA) molecules and multiple proteins. A set of uridine-rich small nuclear RNA (snRNA) molecules was part of this complex, and given the names U1, U2, U4, U5 and U6. Four of these snRNAs (U1, U2, U4 and U5) were found to be tightly bound to several small proteins, which were named SmB, SmD, SmE, SmF, and SmG in decreasing order of size. SmB has an alternatively spliced variant, SmB', and a very similar protein, SmN, replaces SmB'/B in certain (mostly neural) tissues. SmD was later discovered to be a mixture of three proteins, which were named SmD1, SmD2 and SmD3. These nine proteins (SmB, SmB', SmN, SmD1, SmD2, SmD3, SmE, SmF and SmG) became known as the Sm core proteins, or simply Sm proteins. The snRNAs are complexed with the Sm core proteins and with other proteins to form particles in the cell's nucleus called small nuclear ribonucleoproteins, or snRNPs. By the mid-1980s, it became clear that these snRNPs help form a large (4.8 MD molecular weight) complex, called the spliceosome, around pre-mRNA, excising portions of the pre-mRNA called introns and splicing the coding portions (exons) together. After a few more modifications, the spliced pre-mRNA becomes messenger RNA (mRNA) which is then exported from the nucleus and translated into a protein by ribosomes.

=== Sm-like proteins ===
The snRNA U6 (unlike U1, U2, U4 and U5) does not associate with the Sm proteins, even though the U6 snRNP is a central component in the spliceosome. In 1999 a protein heteromer was found that binds specifically to U6, and consisted of seven proteins clearly homologous to the Sm proteins. These proteins were denoted LSm (like Sm) proteins (LSm1, LSm2, LSm3, LSm4, LSm5, LSm6 and LSm7), with the similar LSm8 protein identified later. In the bacterium Escherichia coli, the Sm-like protein HF-I encoded by the gene hfq was described in 1968 as an essential host factor for RNA bacteriophage Qβ replication. The genome of Saccharomyces cerevisiae (Baker's Yeast) was sequenced in the mid-1990s, providing a rich resource for identifying homologs of these human proteins. Subsequently, as more eukaryotes genomes were sequenced, it became clear that eukaryotes, in general, share homologs to the same set of seven Sm and eight LSm proteins. Soon after, proteins homologous to these eukaryote LSm proteins were found in Archaea (Sm1 and Sm2) and Bacteria (Hfq and YlxS homologs). The archaeal LSm proteins are more similar to the eukaryote LSm proteins than either are to bacterial LSm proteins. The LSm proteins described thus far were rather small proteins, varying from 76 amino acids (8.7 kD molecular weight) for human SmG to 231 amino acids (29 kD molecular weight) for human SmB. But recently, larger proteins have been discovered that include a LSm structural domain in addition to other protein structural domains (such as LSm10, LSm11, LSm12, LSm13, LSm14, LSm15, LSm16, ataxin-2, as well as archaeal Sm3).

=== Lsm fold ===
Around 1995, comparisons between the various LSm homologs identified two sequence motifs, 32 nucleic acids long (14 amino acids), that were very similar in each LSm homolog, and were separated by a non-conserved region of variable length. This indicated the importance of these two sequence motifs (named Sm1 and Sm2), and suggested that all LSm protein genes evolved from a single ancestral gene. In 1999, crystals of recombinant Sm proteins were prepared, allowing X-ray crystallography and determination of their atomic structure in three dimensions. This demonstrated that the LSm proteins share a similar three-dimensional fold of a short alpha helix and a five-stranded folded beta sheet, subsequently named the LSm fold. Other investigations found that LSm proteins assemble into a torus (doughnut-shaped ring) of six or seven LSm proteins, and that RNA binds to the inside of the torus, with one nucleotide bound to each LSm protein.
