= DDX27 =

Protein-coding gene in the species Homo sapiens

Identifiers
- Aliases: DDX27, DRS1, Drs1p, PP3241, RHLP, dJ686N3.1, HSPC259, DEAD-box helicase 27
- External IDs: OMIM: 616621; MGI: 2385884; GeneCards: DDX27
Enzyme activity
EC #	BRENDA	ExPASy	KEGG	MetaCyc
3.6.4.13	↗	↗	↗	↗

Gene location (Human)
Chr.	Chromosome 20 (human)
Band	20q13.13	Start	49,219,347 bp
Band	20q13.13	End	49,244,077 bp

Gene location (Mouse)
Chr.	Chromosome 2 (mouse)
Band	2|2 H3	Start	166,857,113 bp
Band	2|2 H3	End	166,876,867 bp
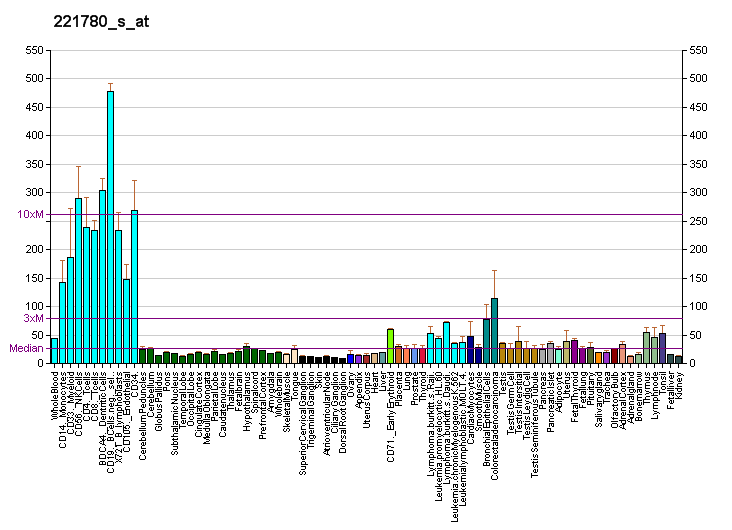

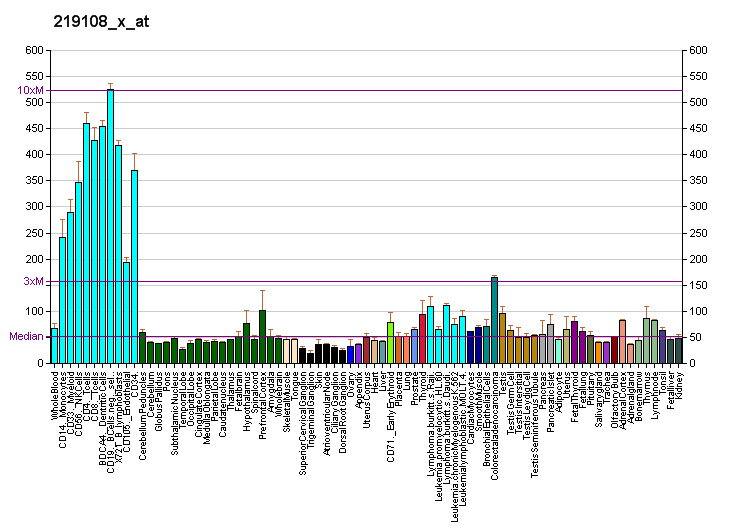

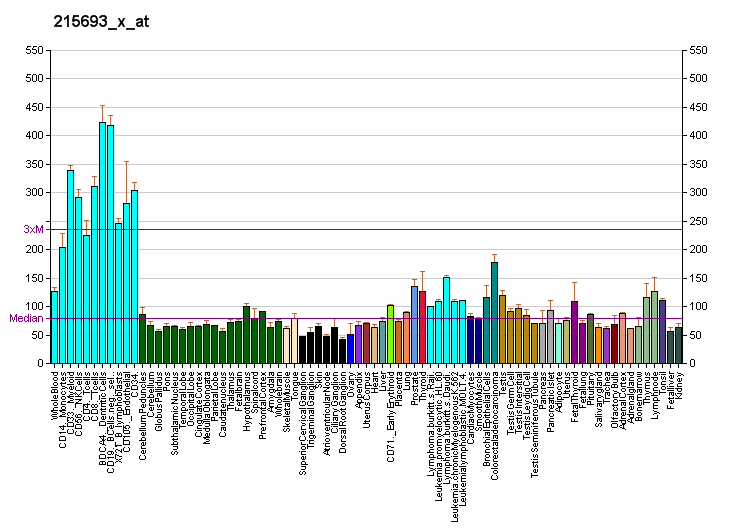
RNA expression pattern
Bgee	Human / Mouse (ortholog); Top expressed in: tendon of biceps brachii; pancreatic ductal cell; endothelial cell; sural nerve; hair follicle; mucosa of ileum; left ovary; right ovary; pylorus; sperm / Top expressed in: epiblast; otic placode; primitive streak; yolk sac; tail of embryo; embryo; otic vesicle; morula; saccule; embryo; More reference expression data
BioGPS	More reference expression data
Gene ontology
Molecular function	nucleotide binding; protein binding; hydrolase activity; ATP binding; helicase activity; nucleic acid binding; RNA binding
Cellular component	nucleolus; nucleus; chromosome; cytoplasm
Biological process	rRNA processing; RNA secondary structure unwinding; ribosome biogenesis
Sources:Amigo / QuickGO
Orthologs
Databases	NCBI: entry; OMA: entry
Species	Human	Mouse
Entrez	55661	228889
Ensembl	ENSG00000124228	ENSMUSG00000017999
UniProt	Q96GQ7	Q921N6
RefSeq (mRNA)	NM_017895; NM_001348187	NM_153065
RefSeq (protein)	NP_060365; NP_001335116	NP_694705
Location (UCSC)	Chr 20: 49.22 – 49.24 Mb	Chr 2: 166.86 – 166.88 Mb
PubMed search
- Wikidata
View/Edit Human	View/Edit Mouse

DEAD (Asp-Glu-Ala-Asp) box polypeptide 27, also known as DDX27, is a human gene.

The protein encoded by this gene belongs to the family of DEAD box proteins, characterized by the conserved motif Asp-Glu-Ala-Asp (DEAD), and are putative RNA helicases. They are implicated in a number of cellular processes involving alteration of RNA secondary structure such as translation initiation, nuclear and mitochondrial splicing, and ribosome and spliceosome assembly. Based on their distribution patterns, some members of this family are believed to be involved in embryogenesis, spermatogenesis, and cellular growth and division. This gene encodes a DEAD box protein, the function of which has not been determined.
