= U11 spliceosomal RNA =

Non-coding RNA involved in alternative splicing

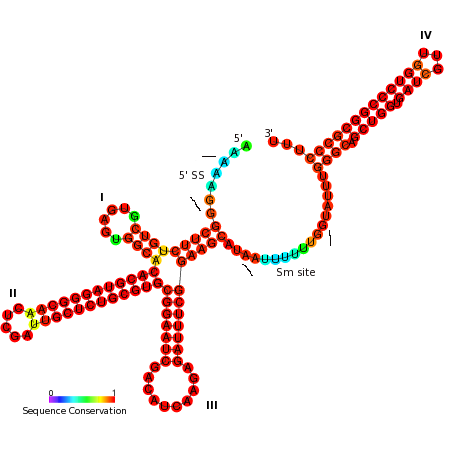
- Secondary structure of human U11 spliceosomal RNA

Identifiers
- Symbol: U11
- Rfam: RF00548

Other data
- RNA type: Gene; snRNA; splicing
- Domain: Eukaryota
- GO: GO:0000369 GO:0030627 GO:0005692
- SO: SO:0000398
- PDB structures: PDBe

The U11 snRNA (small nuclear ribonucleic acid) is an important non-coding RNA in the minor spliceosome protein complex, which activates the alternative splicing mechanism. The minor spliceosome is associated with similar protein components as the major spliceosome. It uses U11 snRNA to recognize the 5' splice site (functionally equivalent to U1 snRNA) while U12 snRNA binds to the branchpoint to recognize the 3' splice site (functionally equivalent to U2 snRNA).

== Secondary structure ==
U11 snRNA has a stem-loop structure with a 5' end as splice site sequence (5' ss) and contains four stem loops structures (I-IV). A structural comparison of U11 snRNA between plants, vertebrates and insects shows that it is folded into a structure with a four-way junction at the 5' site and in a stem loop structure at the 3' site.

=== Binding site during assembly pathway ===
The 5' splice site region possesses sequence complementarity with the 5' splice site of the eukaryotic U12 type pre-mRNA introns. Both the 5' splice site and the Sm binding site are highly conserved in all species. Also, stem loop III is either a possible protein binding site or a base-pairing region since it has a highly conserved nucleotide sequence 'AUCAAGA'.

== Role during alternative splicing ==
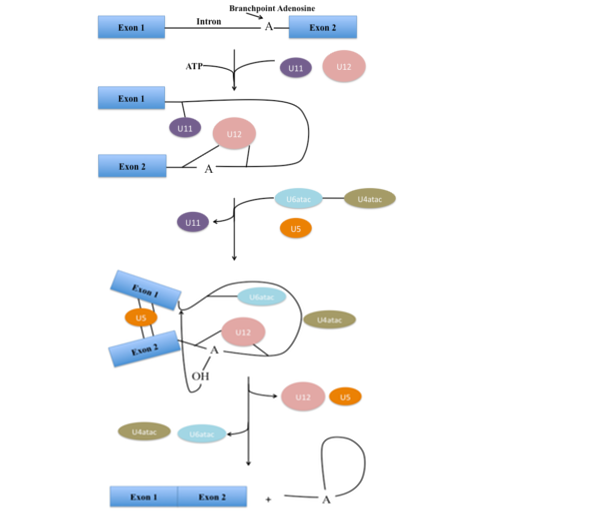
Minor Spliceosome mechanism

U11 and U12 snRNPs (minor spliceosomal pathway) are functional analogs of U1 and U2 snRNPs (major spliceosomal pathway) whereas the U4 atac/U6 atac snRNPs are similar to U4/U6. Unlike the major splicing pathway, U11 and U12 snRNPs bind to the mRNA as a stable, preformed U11/U12 di-snRNP complex. This is done through the use of seven proteins (65K, 59K, 48K, 35K, 31K, 25K and 20K). Four of them (59K, 48K, 35K and 25K) are associated with U11 snRNA.

During the formation of the spliceosome, the 5' end of U11 and U12 snRNAs interact with the 5' splice site and branchpoint sequence of the mRNA respectively, through base pairing. U11 snRNP binds to a tandem repeat known as U11 snRNP-binding splicing enhancer (USSE) and initiates the splicing process. Since both U11 and U12 snRNAs come together as a bicomplex, they form a molecular bridge between two ends of introns in the pre-spliceosomal complex. The U11-48K and U11/U12-65K proteins recognize the splice site of U12 type intron and stabilize the U11/U12 bi-complex. After activating the spliceosomal complex, U11 snRNA leaves the assembly.

This kind of 5' splice site recognition and intron bridging through protein-protein, protein-RNA and RNA-RNA interactions is unique in the minor spliceosomal complex, unlike the major spliceosomal one. Since alternative splicing is the key to the variation of gene expression (mRNA) encoding proteins, U11 is crucial to this regulatory process and responsible in forming a proteomic pool. Therefore U11 snRNA is important in terms of evolutionary aspects.
