= SNAP47 =

Protein found in humans

Identifiers
- Aliases: SNAP47, C1orf142, HEL170, SNAP-47, SVAP1, ESFI5812, HEL-S-290, synaptosome associated protein 47kDa, synaptosome associated protein 47, uncharacterized LOC100130093
- External IDs: MGI: 1915076; GeneCards: SNAP47

Gene location (Mouse)
| Chr. | Chromosome 11 (mouse) |
| Band | 11|11 B1.3 | Start | 59,297,960 bp |
| Band | 11|11 B1.3 | End | 59,342,012 bp |
Gene ontology
| Molecular function | SNAP receptor activity; syntaxin binding; protein binding |
| Cellular component | SNARE complex; perinuclear region of cytoplasm; endomembrane system; plasma membrane; BLOC-1 complex; membrane; cytoplasm; soma; dendrite; synaptic vesicle membrane; glutamatergic synapse; postsynaptic density; asymmetric synapse; hippocampal mossy fiber to CA3 synapse |
| Biological process | synaptic vesicle priming; long-term potentiation; synaptic vesicle fusion to presynaptic active zone membrane; exocytic insertion of neurotransmitter receptor to postsynaptic membrane; vesicle-mediated transport in synapse; exocytosis; vesicle fusion |
Sources:Amigo / QuickGO
Orthologs
| Databases | NCBI: entry; OMA: entry |
| Species | Human | Mouse |
| Entrez | 116841 | 67826 |
| Ensembl | ENSG00000143740 | ENSMUSG00000009894 |
| UniProt | Q5SQN1 | Q8R570 |
| RefSeq (mRNA) | n/a | NM_144521; NM_001356452; NM_001356454 |
| RefSeq (protein) | NP_001310859; NP_001310860; NP_001310861; NP_001310862; NP_001310863 NP_001310864; NP_444280 | NP_653104; NP_001343381; NP_001343383 |
| Location (UCSC) | n/a | Chr 11: 59.3 – 59.34 Mb |
| PubMed search |
- Wikidata
| View/Edit Human | View/Edit Mouse |

Synaptosome-associated protein, 47 kDal (SNAP47) is a human protein encoded by the SNAP47 gene. Other aliases of this gene are SVAP1, HEL170, ESFI5812, and HEL-S-290. SNAP47 is a synaptosome protein which is associated with the protein coding in multiple diseases, including non small cell lung cancer and schizophrenia. SNAP47 is a member of the SNAP protein family. SNAP proteins are t-snare proteins that are a component of SNARE complex. The SNARE complex mediates vesicle fusion by creating tight complex that brings vesicle and membrane together. This protein causes ubiquitous expression in testis, ovary, and many other tissues.

== Gene ==
The gene is located at 1q42.13, meaning on chromosome 1 on the long arm of the chromosome in region 42, sub region 13. There are a total of 13 exons and 12 introns. This gene spans 52,693 base pairs. It is encoded on the plus strand. The coordinates for this gene are 227728518-227781231. The gene is flanked by ZNF678 gene and PRSS38 gene on the chromosome while the same location on the minus strand JMJD4 gene.

== Protein ==
The most common isoform of SNAP47 is 419 amino acids long. SNAP47 protein is a synaptosome associated protein. Its molecular weight has been found to be 47167 M. SNARE complex (soluble N-ethylmaleimide-sensitive factor attachment protein receptor) includes syntaxin proteins, VAMP proteins and SNAP proteins. SNARE proteins are generally known to be related to vesicle fusion—mediating exocytosis or neurotransmitter release.

They have also been associated with BLOC-1 (biogenesis of lysosome-related organelles complex-1). Hippocampal neurons deficient in BLOC-1 suggest neurite outgrowth defects which when taken with association of SNARE leads to possible variants of genes encoding BLOC-1—DTNBP1—in schizophrenia models.

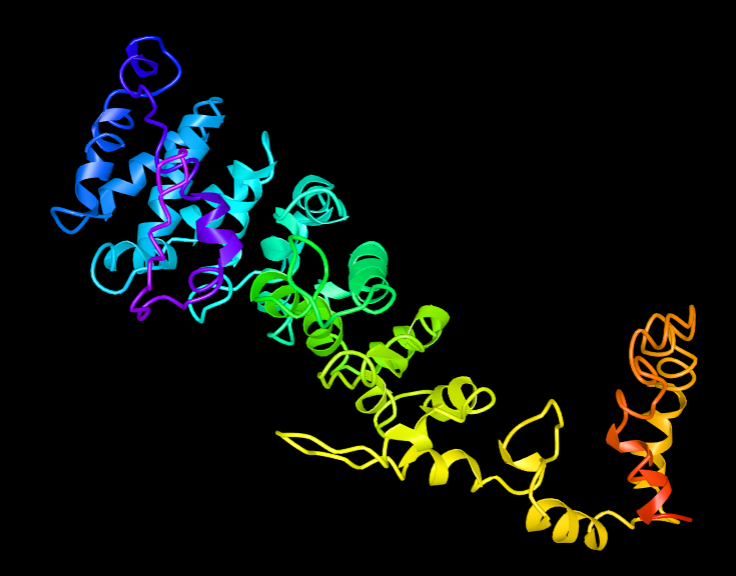
C1orf142 model as proposed by I-Tasser. Image colored in rainbow from N to C terminus.

=== Secondary structure ===
The secondary structure of SNAP47 has some long alpha helices intermixed with beta sheet and random coils. The alpha helix are placed at about amino acid 120-150 and amino acids 350-415. SNARE proteins are believed to form compact four-helix complex with membranes. The two alpha helices found are consistent with this observation.

=== Tertiary structure ===
I-TASSER assembled and then aligned possible SNAP47 tertiary sequence with 5VOX, a Yeast V-ATPase, and a Ufd2 complexed with ubiquitin-like domain Rad23. The TM scores respectively were 0.917 and 0.584.

== Regulation of gene expression ==
=== Gene level regulation ===
==== Promoter ====
SNAP47 carries 4 promoter regions that create different variants of transcription. These were identified using by Eldorado at Genomatix. Promoter B boosts transcript variant 2—GXT_27753855.

SNAP47 Promoters
| Promoter | Name | Start | End | Length (bp) | Transcript |
| A | GXP_6728372 | 227727168 | 227728207 | 1040 | GXT_27753854 |
| B | GXP_23558 | 227727518 | 227728746 | 1229 | GXT_2743329, GXT_2743651, GXT_27753855, GXT_27753856, GXT_27753857, GXT_27753859, GXT_27753858, GXT_24484547, GXT_22776811, GXT_24484548 |
| C | GXP_23501 | 227733817 | 227735492 | 1676 | GXT_2753839, GXT_27753860, GXT_27753861, GXT_2807628, GXT_27753862, GXT_27753863, GXT_27753864, GXT_23529849, GXT_26185912 |
| D | GXP_6728373 | 227734695 | 227735734 | 1040 | GXT_27753865 |
| E | GXP_3183167 | 227735173 | 227736217 | 1045 | GXT_26215912, GXT_24484549 |
| F | GXP_6021433 | 227746689 | 227748193 | 1505 | GXT_27136253, GXT_27136254 |

==== Transcription factors ====
Transcription Factors that have been predicted to attach to the promoter for SNAP47 are SP1, TATAB, and CARF. SP1 or Stimulating protein 1 had a matrix similarity of 1.0 and is a ubiquitous zinc finger transcription factor and is on the minus strand. TATAB is a TATA binding protein factor with a similar matrix of 0.945. CARF is a calcium response element with a matrix similarity of 0.928. SNAP25 decreases Ca^{2+} responsiveness in GABAargic synapses.

==== Expression pattern ====
RNAseq data display SNAP47 to be highly expressed in the adrenal gland, fetal brain, adult brain and the heart. The adrenal gland, hormone producer, was transcribed at 8 reads per kilobase per million (RPKM). The lungs transcription is relatively low transcription except in a 17-week-old fetus. The transcription of the 17-week-old fetus lung is above 2 RPKM. There is low transcription rate (below 2 RPKM) found in the fetal liver, trachea, pancreas and bone marrow. In the cell, SNAP47 localizes cytoplasm, the endoplasmic reticulum (ER), and Vesicular-tubular cluster (ERGIC).

The protein abundance is about average when compared to all the other proteins in humans. However, the mRNA has a higher than average abundance seen in this microarray. The mRNA is at or above the 75th percentile in the microarray for most of the tissues tested. This may suggest that there is a larger expression rate but the protein is used up quickly for its function.

=== Protein level regulation ===
==== Post-transnational modification ====
SNAP47 had multiple possible post-translational modifications. High conserved phosphorylation sites were predicted at Y15, S129, S262, and S284—none with specific kinases. Protein Kinase C plays a role in several signal transduction cascades including calcium release. They had had scores of 0.830, 0.747, and 0.812 at S82, S223, and S231 respectively.

Palmitoylation sites are important in anchoring the SNARE complex to the cytosolic side of membranes. Since many SNAP proteins do not have trans-membrane domains, these are common way of attachment. The Palitic acid is covalently attaches to a cysteine residue. Two Palmitoylation sites were predicted at the beginning of SNAP47 protein at Cys6 and Cys12.

Propeptide cleavage site was predicted at R417 while an acetylation was predicted on S2.

== Homology and evolution ==
=== Orthologs ===
As of June 2020, SNAP47 is conserved in 310 orthologs. C. lupus, a wolf/dog, has a 74.2% identity. M. mulatta, a monkey, was aligned with the Homo sapiens protein transcript and a 67.1% identical amino acids were found. P. marinus, a sea lamprey, is the most distant ortholog found at a 36.1% sequence identity. It was conserved in eukaryotes but not bacteria or Archaea. A selected list of orthologs obtained are shown below.

SNAP 47 Orthologs
| Genus/species | Common name | Order | Date of divergence (MYA) | Accession number | Seq. length (a.a.) | Seq. identity (%) | Seq. similarity (%) |
| Homo sapiens | Human | Primates | 0 | NP_001310859.1 | 419 | 100 | 100 |
| Canis lupus | Wolf | Therapsid | 29 | XP_022282898.1 | 415 | 74.2 | 85.9 |
| Rattus norvegicus | Brown rat | Rodentia | 90 | NP_955421.1 | 419 | 73.3 | 85.7 |
| Mus musculus | Mouse | Rodentia | 90 | NP_001343381.1 | | 67.1 | 81.1 |
| Globicephala melas | Long-finned whale | Cetacea | 96 | XP_030700680.1 | 420 | 78.8 | 89.3 |
| Pteropus vampyrus | Large flying fox | Chiroptera | 96 | XP_011370249.1 | 417 | 76.8 | 88.3 |
| Loxodonta africana | Elephant | Proboscidea | 105 | XP_010599029.1 | 420 | 77.9 | 88.8 |
| Echinops telfairi | Hedgehogs | Afrosoricida | 105 | XP_004696933.1 | 420 | 74.0 | 87.4 |
| Gallus gallus | Chicken | Galliformes | 312 | XP_418505.4 | 419 | 59.8 | 79.4 |
| Python bivittatus | Burmese python | Serpentes | 312 | XP_007439072.1 | 422 | 57.3 | 76.2 |
| Nestor notabilis | Kea | Psittaciformes | 312 | XP_010008684.1 | 372 | 52.8 | 70.9 |
| Xenopus tropicalis | Western clawed frog | Anura | 352 | XP_031759647.1 | 412 | 48.9 | 69.7 |
| Latimeria chalumnae | West Indian ocean coelacanth | coelacanth | 413 | XP_014340899.1 | 418 | 53.9 | 74.2 |
| Lepisosteus oculatus | Spotted gar | Lepisosteiformes | 435 | XP_015209714.1 | 425 | 53.4 | 72.6 |
| Oryzias melastigma | Indian medaka | Beloniformes | 435 | XP_024129479.1 | 422 | 50.6 | 68.9 |
| Denticeps clupeoides | Herring | Clupeiformes | 435 | XP_028833542.1 | 423 | 51.5 | 72.1 |
| Danio rerio | Zebrafish | Cypriniformes | 435 | NP_001038902.1 | 419 | 48.9 | 70.2 |
| Cyprinus carpio | Carp fish | Cypriniformes | 435 | XP_018975338.1 | 419 | 48.1 | 70.5 |
| Sinocyclocheilus grahami | Golden-line barbel | Cypriniformes | 435 | XP_016139191.1 | 332 | 39.8 | 58.6 |
| Amblyraja radiata | Thorny skate | Rajiformes | 473 | XP_032876175.1 | 421 | 49.5 | 68.7 |
| Petromyzon marinus | Sea lamprey | Petromyzontiforme | 615 | XP_032802064.1 | 416 | 36.1 | 54.4 |

=== Paralogs ===
SNAP47 has 3 known paralogs—SNAP23, SNAP25, SNAP 29. The sequence similarity and identity is lower than 30% for all three. This suggest low relationship between different SNAP proteins. SNAP23 and SNAP25 were 55% identical suggesting the relationship between those two paralogs are higher. There is some evidence that if SNAP29 was incapacitated, SNAP47 would be able to take over function of vesicle fusion however, it would not be efficient or successful.

Sequence identity of paralog protein structure compared to SNAP47
| Paralogs | Accession number | Seq. Identity (%) | Seq. Similarity (%) | Gaps |
| SNAP29 | NP_004773.1 | 15.7 | 26.6 | 48.5 |
| SNAP23 | NP_003816.2 | 14.4 | 24.1 | 51.4 |
| SNAP25 | NP_001309831.1 | 11.0 | 20.1 | 65.0 |

== Function/biochemistry ==
Example of SNAP25 SNARE acrivity resulting in neurotransmitter release of Ca^{2+}

The paralogs, SNAP23 and SNAP25 are t-SNARE proteins, meaning it is present on the presynaptic plasma membrane that is being fused to (the target). These proteins bind to syntaxin protein that attaches to the membrane. SNAP29, however, is binds to syntaxin on vesicles membranes rather than to plasma membranes. SNAP29 has also been found to be membrane bound with a large amount sticking into the cytoplasm.

== Interacting proteins ==
Many interacting proteins are related to vesicle-associated proteins. Some important proteins that interact with the SNAP47 protein are vesicle-associated membrane protein (VAMP) and syntaxin (Stx) which are both used in the SNARE complex. Various paralogs for VAMP and Stx were found as possible interactions. They were experimentally tested using anti-tag coimmunoprecipitation. VAMP4 and Stx-1A interact in the calcium dependent exocytosis. Golgin subfamily A member 2 protein (GOLGA2) is a protein used as a vesicle facilitating vesicle fusion with Golgi apparatus. A microarray as well as prey pooling approach were used to determine this interaction between GOLGA2 and SNAP47. A component of LINC (linker of Nucleoskeleton and cytoskeleton) Complex is the KASH5 protein that was found to interact with SNAP47 by a two hybrid and prey pooling approach.

== Clinical significance ==
Two viruses that interact are rep and PVR proteins which are replicase polyprotein 1ab and Poliovirus receptor respectively. Replicase polyprotein 1ab protein is in the human Sars coronavirus. Rep is involved in the transcription and replication of viral RNAs. An alternative name is the ORF1ab polyprotein. It contains the polyprotein cleavage proteinases. The optimum pH for the proteinase activity is 7.0. Pp1ab is known to be cleaved in 15 different chains including (not limited to) Host translation inhibitor nsp1, 3C-like proteinase, and helicase. Not much is known in how it interacts with SNAP47.

The poliovirus receptor plays a role in cell motility during tumor cell invasion and migration. PVR binds to CD96 and CD226—natural killer cell receptors. This can cause PVR to possibly be transferred to NK cells and cause fratricide of Natural killer cells which can increase metastasizing possibilities. Although the lung does not seem to have a large expression of this protein, it has been found that C1orf142 has larger expression rates in cell line of giant cell lung carcinoma they have high metastatic potential. Cell line 95D (high metastatic potential) was studied along with 95C (low metastatic potential) and it is suggested that there is a possible link between SNAP47 protein and metastasis in lung cancers.
