= Small nucleolar RNA SNORA79 =

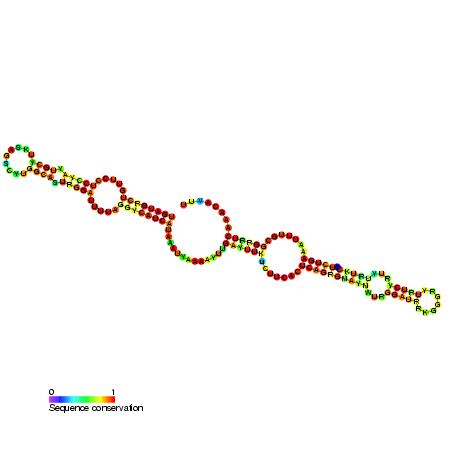
- Predicted secondary structure and sequence conservation of SNORA79

Identifiers
- Symbol: SNORA79
- Rfam: RF00600

Other data
- RNA type: Gene; snRNA; snoRNA; H/ACA-box
- Domain: Eukaryota
- GO: GO:0006396 GO:0005730
- SO: SO:0000594
- PDB structures: PDBe

In molecular biology, Small nucleolar RNA SNORA79 (also known as ACA65) is a non-coding RNA (ncRNA) molecule which functions in the biogenesis (modification) of other small nuclear RNAs (snRNAs). This type of modifying RNA is located in the nucleolus of the eukaryotic cell which is a major site of snRNA biogenesis. It is known as a small nucleolar RNA (snoRNA).

SNORA79 was identified by computational screening and its expression in mouse experimentally verified by Northern blot and primer extension analysis. It belongs to the H/ACA box class of snoRNAs as it has the predicted hairpin-hinge-hairpin-tail structure and the conserved H/ACA-box motifs.

SNORA79 is proposed to guide the pseudouridylation of residue U31 in U6 snRNA. Pseudouridylation is the isomerisation of the nucleoside uridine to the different isomeric form pseudouridine.
