= Polypyrimidine tract =

Pyrimidine-rich sequence involved in pre-messenger RNA maturation

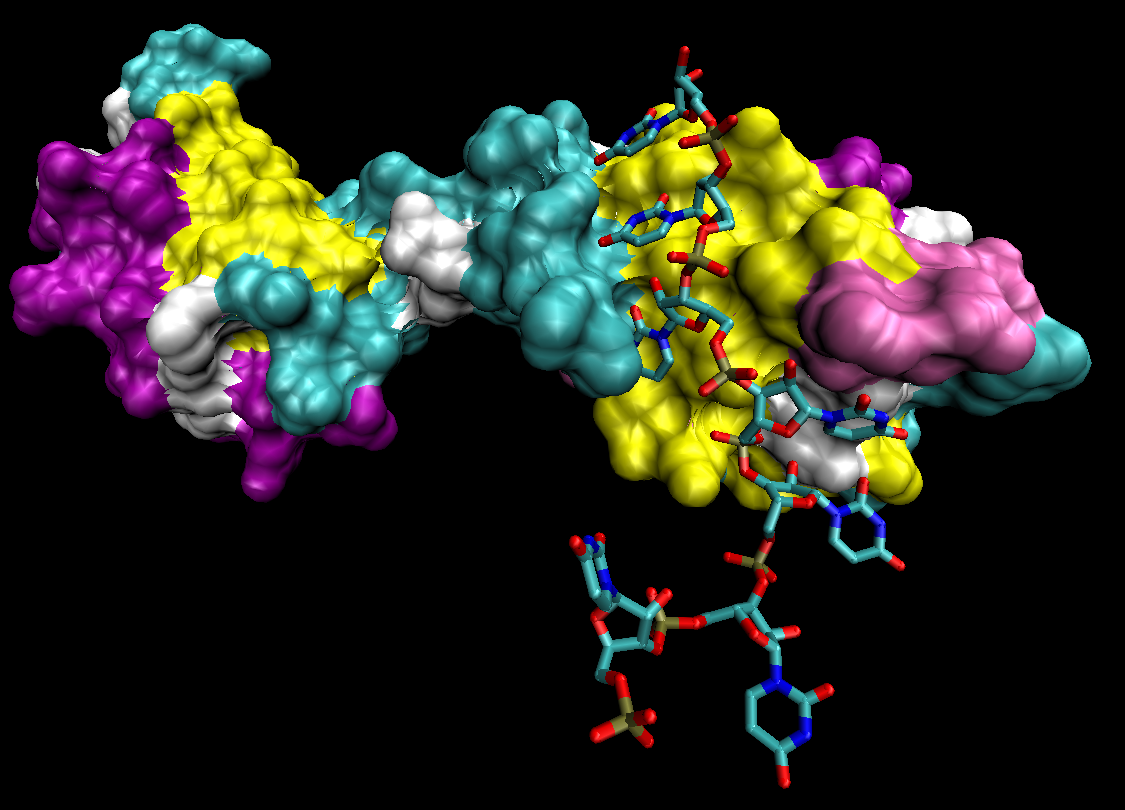
The essential spliceosome component U2AF bound to a short polypyrimidine RNA fragment.

The polypyrimidine tract is a region of pre-messenger RNA (mRNA) that promotes the assembly of the spliceosome, the protein complex specialized for carrying out RNA splicing during the process of post-transcriptional modification. The region is rich with pyrimidine nucleotides, especially uracil, and is usually 15–20 base pairs long, located about 5–40 base pairs before the 3' end of the intron to be spliced.

A number of protein factors bind to or associate with the polypyrimidine tract, including the spliceosome component U2AF and the polypyrimidine tract-binding protein (PTB), which plays a regulatory role in alternative splicing. PTB's primary function is in exon silencing, by which a particular exon region normally spliced into the mature mRNA is instead left out, resulting in the expression of an isoform of the protein for which the mRNA codes. Because PTB is ubiquitously expressed in many higher eukaryotes, it is thought to suppress the inclusion of "weak" exons with poorly defined splice sites. However, PTB binding is not sufficient to suppress "robust" exons.

The suppression or selection of exons is critical to the proper expression of tissue-specific isoforms. For example, smooth muscle and skeletal muscle express alternate isoforms distinguished by mutually exclusive exon selection in alpha-tropomyosin.

While the polypyrimidine tract is largely conserved among eukaryotes, there are some exceptions to the rule. Introns of the green alga Chlamydomonas reinhardtii commonly contain a region rich in cytosine upstream of the 3' end of the intron.
