= A-kinase anchor protein 17A =

Protein found in humans

AKAP17A

Identifiers
- Aliases: AKAP17A, 721P, AKAP-17A, CCDC133, CXYorf3, DXYS155E, PRKA17A, SFRS17A, XE7, XE7Y, A-kinase anchoring protein 17A
- External IDs: OMIM: 312095, 465000; GeneCards: AKAP17A
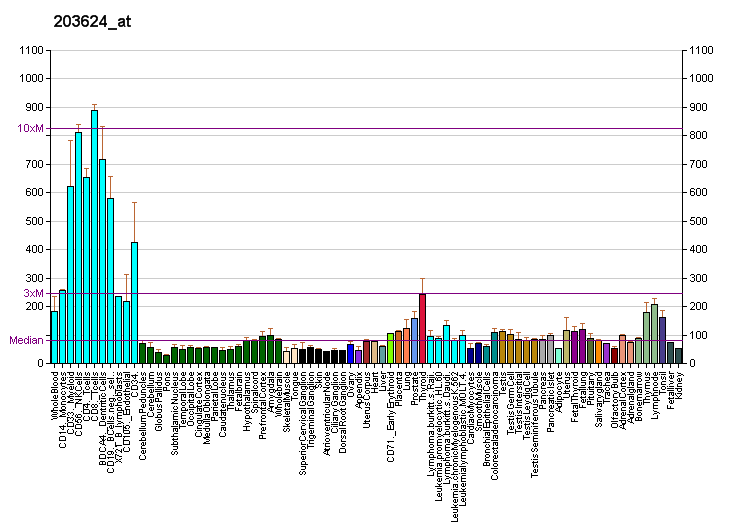

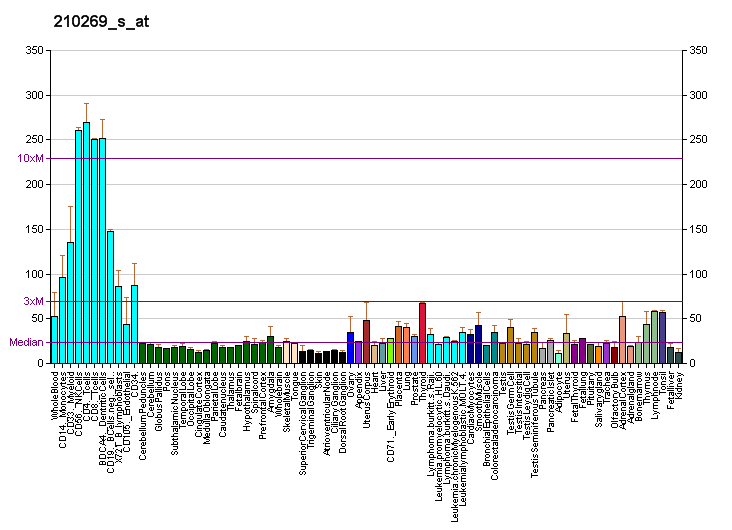
RNA expression pattern
Bgee	Human / Mouse (ortholog); Top expressed in: tibia; spleen; sural nerve; parietal pleura; right lobe of thyroid gland; left lobe of thyroid gland; right uterine tube; body of pancreas; right lobe of liver; blood / n/a; More reference expression data
BioGPS	More reference expression data
Gene ontology
Molecular function	protein binding; nucleic acid binding; RNA binding; protein kinase A binding
Cellular component	nuclear speck; spliceosomal complex; nucleus; cytosol
Biological process	B cell activation; mRNA processing; regulation of transcription, DNA-templated; RNA splicing; signal transduction; regulation of RNA splicing
Sources:Amigo / QuickGO
Orthologs
Databases	NCBI: entry
Species	Human	Mouse
Entrez	8227	n/a
Ensembl	n/a	n/a
UniProt	Q02040	n/a
RefSeq (mRNA)	NM_005088	n/a
RefSeq (protein)	NP_005079	n/a
Location (UCSC)	n/a	n/a
PubMed search		n/a
- Wikidata
View/Edit Human

A-kinase anchor protein 17A is a protein that in humans is encoded by the AKAP17A gene (previously SFRS17A). The AKAP17A protein is part of the spliceosome complex and is involved in alternative RNA splicing.
