= Minor spliceosome =

The minor spliceosome is a complex of RNA and proteins (ribonucleoprotein complex) that catalyses the removal (splicing) of an atypical class of introns, called U12-type, from pre-messenger RNAs in most eukaryotes. This process is called noncanonical splicing, as opposed to the more common U2-dependent canonical splicing. U12-type introns represent less than 1% of all introns in human cells. However they are found in genes performing essential cellular functions.

Illustration of exons and introns in pre-mRNA. The mature mRNA is formed by splicing.

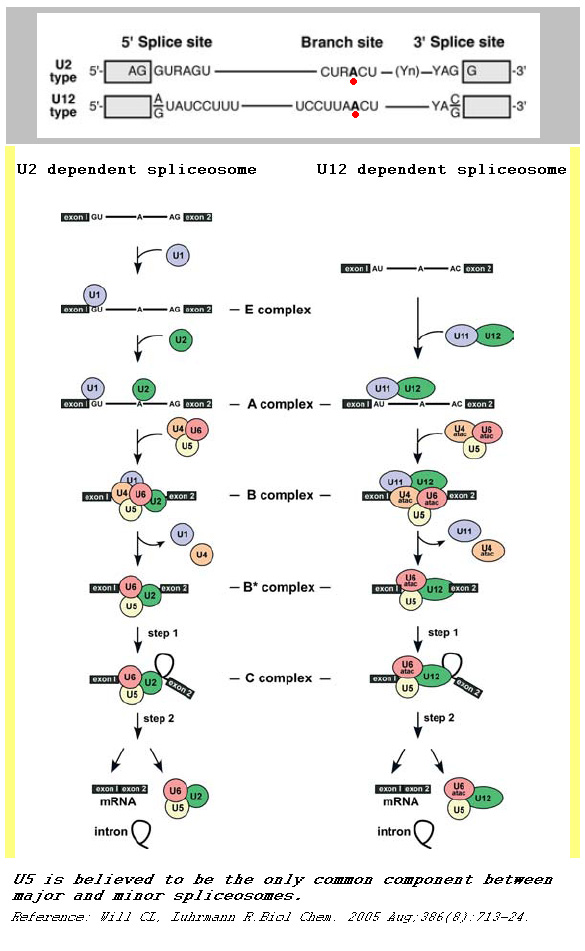
A comparison between major and minor splicing mechanisms

== Overview ==
In eukaryotes, the nucleotide sequences near the splice sites have a relatively high level of conservation. In humans, for example, 99+% of introns possess a set of standard motifs, for example GT-AG nucleotides at their ends. These introns are spliced out of the pre-mRNA by a collection of RNA and proteins called the major spliceosome. However, a relatively small fraction of introns have AT-AC ends, or other distinct characteristics, and are instead spliced by the minor spliceosome. The minor spliceosome consists of proteins and a set of RNAs (U11, U12, U4atac, U5, and U6atac) that are roughly analogous to those found in the major spliceosome (U1, U2, U4, U5, and U6), with the U5 RNA shared between the two.

One of the core differences in the process is that the U11 and U12 bind to the pre-mRNA as a pair, unlike U1 and U2 in the major spliceosome that bind separately and then are later brought together. For reasons that are not fully understood, this process is ~2-5x slower and more error prone than major spliceosome splicing. While the minor spliceosome-spliced introns are found in most eukaryotes, they are notably missing in certain species, including most nematodes.

== Structure of U12-type introns ==
Although originally referred to as AT-AC introns, not all these introns are delimited by AT-AC dinucleotides. In fact, having GT–AG ends is more common among U12-type introns, while other combinations like GT-AG or AT-AG mixed ends also exist, but are rarer. Because of this lack of consistency, it is now common to use terminology that references the splicing machinery which is used to process them, differentiating between U2-type (canonical or major) and U12-type (non-canonical or minor). The main determinants for distinguishing U2- and U12-type introns are 5' splice site and branch site sequences.

U1 and U11 can be folded similarly

The minor spliceosome consists of U11, U12, U4atac, and U6atac, together with U5 and an unknown number of non-snRNP proteins. The U11, U12 and U4atac/U6atac snRNPs are functional analogs of the U1, U2 and U4/U6 snRNPs in the major spliceosome. Although the minor U4atac and U6atac snRNAs are functional analogs of U4 and U6, respectively, they share only limited sequence homology (c. 40%). Furthermore, the sequence of U11 in comparison with U1, as well as U12 compared with U2, are completely unrelated. Despite this fact, the minor U11, U12, U4atac and U6atac snRNAs can be folded into structures similar to U1, U2, U4 and U6, respectively.

== Location of minor spliceosomal activity ==
The location of spliceosomal activity for the minor class spliceosome is in the nucleus. There was previously some debate among experts about whether it might be located in the cytosol, but subsequent research indicated that this is not the case.

== Evolution ==
Like the major spliceosome, the minor spliceosome had an early origin: several of its characteristic constituents are present in representative organisms from all eukaryotic supergroups for which there is any substantial genome sequence information. In addition, functionally important sequence elements contained within U12-type introns and snRNAs are highly conserved during evolution.

== Discovery ==
A notable feature of eukaryotic nuclear pre-mRNA introns is the relatively high level of conservation of the primary sequences of 5' and 3' splice sites over a great range of organisms.

Between 1989 and 1991, several groups reported four independent examples of introns with a splice site that differed from the common intron:

- Cartilage matrix protein (CMP/MATN1) gene in humans and chickens
- Proliferating cell nucleolar protein P120 (NOL1) gene in humans
- Mouse Rep3 gene, presumably involved in DNA repair
- Drosophila prospero gene that encodes for a homeobox protein

In 1991 by comparing the intron sequences of P120 and CMP genes, IJ Jackson reported the existence of ATATCC (5') and YYCAC (3') splice sites in these introns. The finding indicated a possible novel splicing mechanism.

In 1994, S.L. Hall and R.A. Padgett compared the primary sequence of all reports on the four genes mentioned above. The results suggested a new type of introns with ATATCCTT 5' splice sites and YCCAC 3' splice sites and an almost invariant TCCTTAAC sequence near the 3' end of the introns (so called 3' upstream element). A search for small nuclear RNA sequences that are complementary to these splice sites suggested U12 snRNA (matches the 3' sequence) and U11 snRNA (matches the 5' sequence) as being putative factors involved in splicing of this new type of introns.

In all these four genes, the pre-mRNA contains other introns whose sequences conform to those of major class introns. Neither the size nor the position of the AT–AC intron within the host gene is conserved.

In 1996, Woan-Yuh Tarn and Joan A. Steitz described an in vitro system that splices a pre-mRNA substrate containing an AT–AC intron derived from the human P120 gene. Psoralen cross-linking confirms the base-pairing interaction predicted by Hall and Padgett between the branch site of the pre-mRNA substrate and U12 RNA. Native gel electrophoresis reveals that U11, U12, and U5 snRNPs assemble onto the P120 pre-mRNA to form splicing complexes.

== See also ==
- RNA splicing
- Spliceosome
