= Exon trapping =

Exon trapping is a molecular biology technique to identify potential exons in a fragment of eukaryote DNA of unknown intron-exon structure. This is done to determine if the fragment is part of an expressed gene.

The genomic fragment is inserted into the intron of a 'splicing vector' consisting of a known exon - intron - exon sequence of DNA, and the vector is then inserted into a eukaryotic cell. If the fragment does not contain exons (i.e., consists solely of intron DNA), it will be spliced out together with the vector's original intron. On the other hand, if exons are contained, they will be part of the mature mRNA after transcription (with all intron material removed). The presence of 'trapped exons' can be detected by an increase in size of the mRNA, or through RT-PCR to amplify the DNA of interest.

The technique has largely been supplanted by the approach of sequencing cDNA generated from mRNA and then using bioinformatics tools such as NCBI's BLAST server to determine the source of the sequence, thereby identifying the appropriate exon-intron splice sites.
