= CLASP1 =

Protein found in humans

Identifiers
- Aliases: CLASP1, MAST1, cytoplasmic linker associated protein 1
- External IDs: OMIM: 605852; MGI: 1923957; GeneCards: CLASP1
Available structures
PDB	Ortholog search: PDBe RCSB
PDB	List of PDB id codes 4K92

Gene location (Human)
Chr.	Chromosome 2 (human)
Band	2q14.2-q14.3	Start	121,337,776 bp
Band	2q14.2-q14.3	End	121,649,476 bp

Gene location (Mouse)
Chr.	Chromosome 1 (mouse)
Band	1|1 E2.3	Start	118,389,058 bp
Band	1|1 E2.3	End	118,612,678 bp
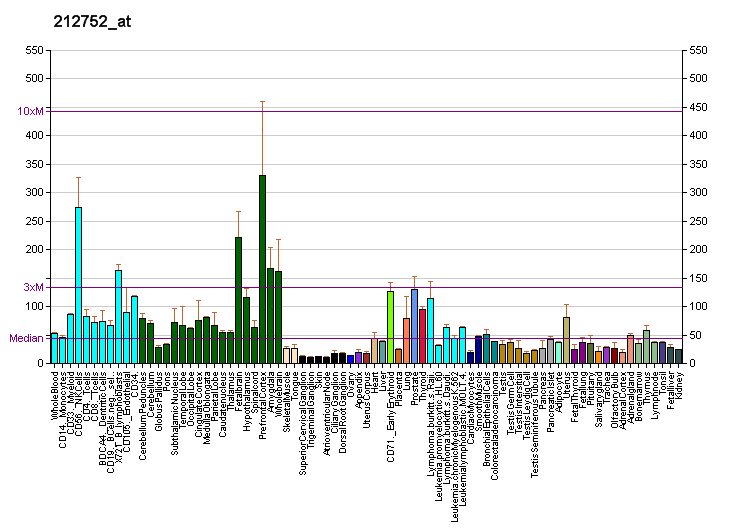

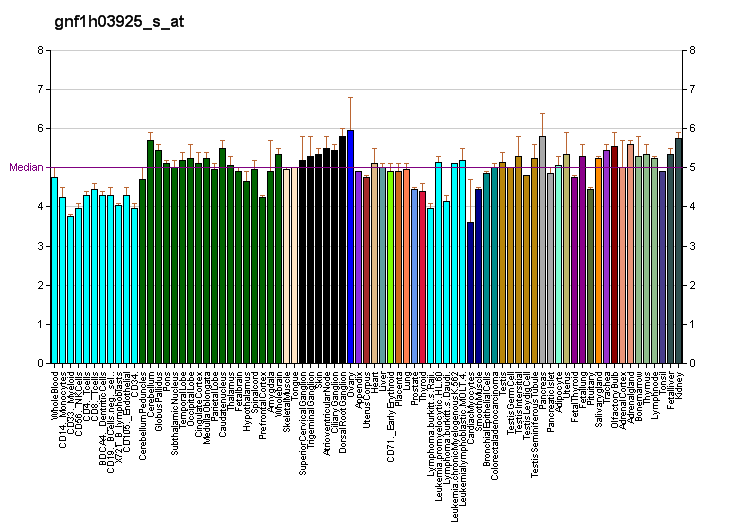

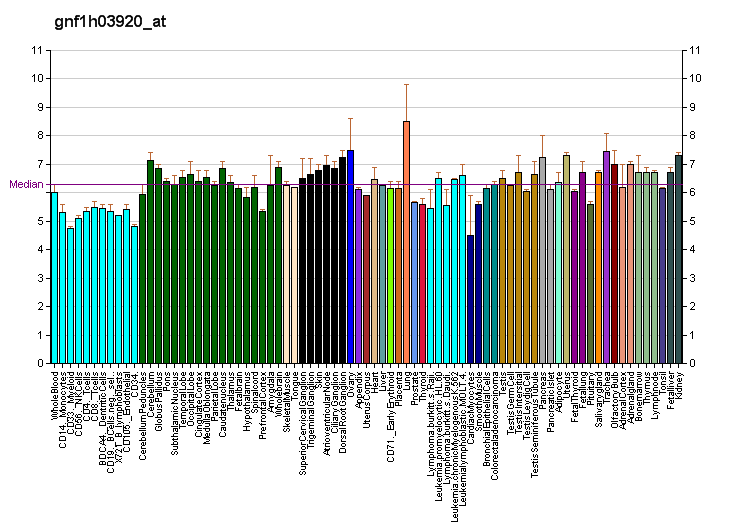
RNA expression pattern
Bgee	Human / Mouse (ortholog); Top expressed in: Achilles tendon; dorsal motor nucleus of vagus nerve; spinal ganglia; Region I of hippocampus proper; postcentral gyrus; cerebellar vermis; corpus callosum; inferior olivary nucleus; lateral nuclear group of thalamus; entorhinal cortex / Top expressed in: myocardium of ventricle; right ventricle; cardiac muscles; atrium; atrioventricular valve; Rostral migratory stream; epithelium of lens; median eminence; pontine nuclei; superior cervical ganglion; More reference expression data
BioGPS	More reference expression data
Gene ontology
Molecular function	kinetochore binding; dystroglycan binding; microtubule binding; microtubule plus-end binding; protein binding
Cellular component	cytoplasm; cytosol; centrosome; Golgi apparatus; kinetochore microtubule; membrane; cortical microtubule cytoskeleton; focal adhesion; spindle; centrosomal corona; chromosome; microtubule plus-end; microtubule organizing center; cell cortex; spindle microtubule; cytoplasmic microtubule; basal cortex; extracellular exosome; chromosome, centromeric region; cytoskeleton; microtubule; kinetochore
Biological process	establishment of epithelial cell polarity; vesicle targeting; Golgi organization; mitotic spindle organization; regulation of epithelial to mesenchymal transition; regulation of microtubule cytoskeleton organization; positive regulation of epithelial cell migration; exit from mitosis; cell division; establishment or maintenance of cell polarity; positive regulation of extracellular matrix disassembly; positive regulation of basement membrane assembly involved in embryonic body morphogenesis; negative regulation of microtubule depolymerization; mitotic spindle assembly; microtubule anchoring; G2/M transition of mitotic cell cycle; microtubule bundle formation; negative regulation of microtubule polymerization or depolymerization; positive regulation of microtubule polymerization; regulation of focal adhesion assembly; negative regulation of wound healing, spreading of epidermal cells; cell cycle; positive regulation of exocytosis; negative regulation of stress fiber assembly; establishment of spindle orientation; astral microtubule organization; microtubule organizing center organization; establishment of mitotic spindle localization; regulation of gastrulation; microtubule cytoskeleton organization; microtubule nucleation; sister chromatid cohesion; ciliary basal body-plasma membrane docking; regulation of G2/M transition of mitotic cell cycle
Sources:Amigo / QuickGO
Orthologs
Databases	NCBI: entry; OMA: entry
Species	Human	Mouse
Entrez	23332	76707
Ensembl	ENSG00000074054	ENSMUSG00000064302
UniProt	Q7Z460	Q80TV8
RefSeq (mRNA)	NM_001142273; NM_001142274; NM_001207051; NM_015282; NM_001378003 NM_001378004; NM_001378005; NM_001395891	NM_001081276; NM_001293300; NM_001293301; NM_029709; NM_177548 NM_001359328; NM_001359329; NM_001359330; NM_001359331; NM_001359334; NM_001359335; NM_001359336; NM_001359337; NM_001359338; NM_001359339; NM_001359340; NM_001359341; NM_001359342; NM_001359343; NM_001359345; NM_001359346; NM_001359347
RefSeq (protein)	NP_001135745; NP_001135746; NP_001193980; NP_056097; NP_001364932 NP_001364933; NP_001364934	NP_001280229; NP_001280230; NP_083985; NP_001346257; NP_001346258 NP_001346259; NP_001346260; NP_001346263; NP_001346264; NP_001346265; NP_001346266; NP_001346267; NP_001346268; NP_001346269; NP_001346270; NP_001346271; NP_001346272; NP_001346274; NP_001346275; NP_001346276
Location (UCSC)	Chr 2: 121.34 – 121.65 Mb	Chr 1: 118.39 – 118.61 Mb
PubMed search
- Wikidata
View/Edit Human	View/Edit Mouse

Cytoplasmic linker associated protein 1, also known as CLASP1, is a protein which in humans is encoded by the CLASP1 gene.

== Function ==
CLASP1 belongs to a family of microtubule-associated proteins involved in attachment of microtubules to the cell cortex in animals and plants. CLASPs, such as CLASP1, interact with CLIPs (e.g., CLIP1). In animal cells, CLASP1 is involved in the regulation of microtubule dynamics at the kinetochore and throughout the spindle. CLASP1 controls the interactions of astral microtubules with the cell cortex in mitosis, which is important for the proper positioning and orientation of the spindle.

== See also ==
- RNU4ATAC
