= DBASS3/5 =

Computational biology databases

DBASS3 and DBASS5

Content
- Description: databases of aberrant 3'- and 5'-splice sites.

Contact
- Laboratory: International Centre for Genetic Engineering and Biotechnology, Italy
- Authors: Emanuele Buratti
- Primary citation: Buratti & al. (2011)
- Release date: 2010

Access
- Website: http://www.dbass.org.uk/

DBASS3 and DBASS5 in computational biology is a database of new exon boundaries induced by pathogenic mutations in human disease genes.

The database has been used in a large number of studies; Google Scholar has 87 entries for papers using DBASS3, and 80 for papers using DBASS5.

== See also ==
- Human diseases markers
