= Exon-intron database =

Database of spliced mRNA sequences

EID

Content
- Description: database of protein-coding intron-containing genes.

Contact
- Research center: Harvard University
- Laboratory: Department of Molecular Biology
- Authors: S Saxonov
- Primary citation: Saxonov & al. (2000)

Access
- Website: http://bpg.utoledo.edu/~afedorov/lab/eid.html

The Exon-Intron Database (EID) is a database of spliced mRNA sequences.

== See also ==
- Alternative splicing
- Exon
- Intron
