= U4atac minor spliceosomal RNA =

Small nuclear RNA in humans

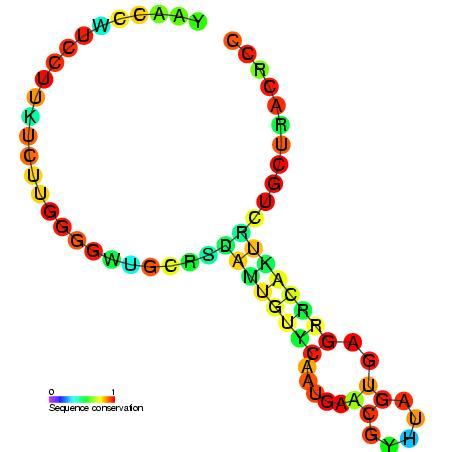
- Predicted secondary structure and sequence conservation of U4atac

Identifiers
- Symbol: RNU4ATAC
- Alt. Symbols: U4atac, RNU4ATAC1
- Rfam: RF00618

Other data
- RNA type: Gene; snRNA; splicing
- Domain: Eukaryota
- GO: GO:0000355 GO:0000369 GO:0030624 GO:0030627 GO:0005690
- SO: SO:0000274
- PDB structures: PDBe

U4atac minor spliceosomal RNA is a small nuclear RNA that in humans is encoded by the RNU4ATAC gene. It is an essential component of the minor U12-type spliceosome complex. The U12-type spliceosome is required for removal of the rarer class of eukaryotic introns (AT-AC, U12-type).

In addition to the encoded RNA, minor spliceosome complex consists of U11, U12, U5, and U6atac snRNAs. This spliceosome is required for the splicing of approximately 700 specific introns in the human genome.

U4atac snRNA is proposed to form a base-paired complex with another spliceosomal RNA U6atac via two stem loop regions. These interacting stem loops have been shown to be required for in vivo splicing. U4atac also contains a 3' Sm protein binding site which has been shown to be essential for splicing activity. U4atac is the functional analog of U4 spliceosomal RNA in the major U2-type spliceosomal complex.

The Drosophila U4atac snRNA has an additional predicted 3' stem loop terminal to the Sm binding site.

== Genomics ==
The RNU4ATAC gene is located on chromosome 2 (2q14.2). It is a single copy gene that is embedded within an intron of the protein coding CLASP1 gene but is transcribed in the antisense direction from CLASP1.

== Medical significance ==
Defects in this gene are a cause of several human inherited syndromes all of which show autosomal recessive inheritance. These include Taybi-Linder syndrome (microcephalic osteodysplastic primordial dwarfism type 1 (MOPD1), Roifman syndrome and Lowry-Wood syndrome. MOPD I is a developmental disorder that is associated with brain and skeletal abnormalities. It has been shown that the mutations cause defective U12 splicing.
