= Lowry-Wood syndrome =

- Other names: LWS
- Specialty: Medical genetics
- Prevention: none
- Frequency: very rare, only 10 cases reported

Lowry-Wood syndrome, also simply known as LWS, is a very rare genetic disorder which is characterized by dysplasia of the epiphysis, low height/short stature, microcephaly, developmental delay, intellectual disabilities, and congenital nystagmus. Less common (but not rare) features include coxa vara and retinitis pigmentosa. Only 10 cases of this disorder have been described in medical literature. This disorder is associated with mutations in the RNU4ATAC gene, on chromosome 2q14.2
