= SWAP protein domain =

Surp
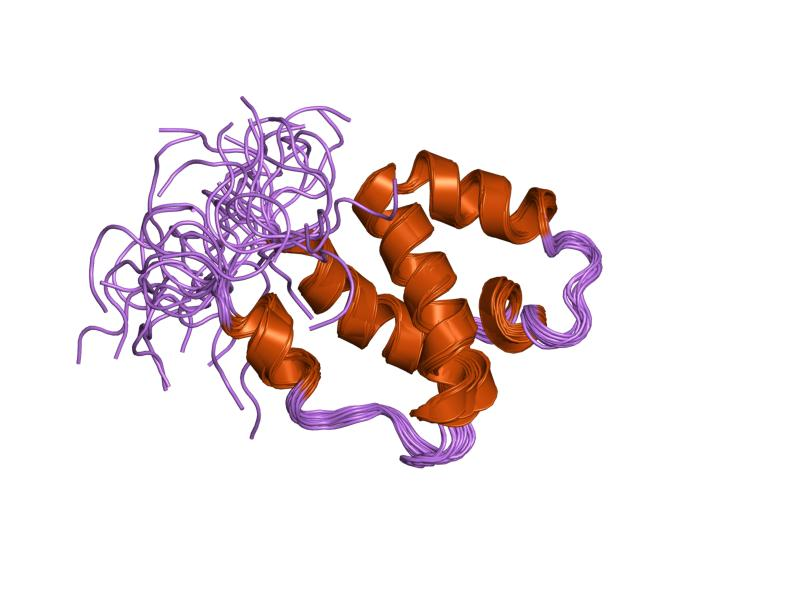
- Solution structure of SURP domain in BAB30904

Identifiers
- Symbol: Surp
- Pfam: PF01805
- InterPro: IPR000061
Available protein structures:
- PDB: IPR000061 PF01805 (ECOD; PDBsum)
- AlphaFold: IPR000061; PF01805

In molecular biology, the protein domain SWAP is derived from the term Suppressor-of-White-APricot, a splicing regulator from the model organism Drosophila melanogaster. The protein domain is found in regulators that control splicing. It is found in splicing regulatory proteins. When a gene is expressed the DNA must be transcribed into messenger RNA (mRNA). However, it sometimes contains intervening or interrupting sequences named introns. mRNA splicing helps to remove these sequences, leaving a more favourable sequence. mRNA splicing is an essential event in the post-transcriptional modification process of gene expression. SWAP helps to control this process in all cells except gametes.

== Function ==
The role of the protein domain SWAP is to control sex-independent pre-mRNA processing in somatic cells, that is, in every cell except the sex cells This includes autoregulation, whereby it regulates the splicing of its own pre-mRNA. The mammalian homologue of SWAP acts as a thyroid hormone regulated gene. This mean it is controlled by the thyroid.

== Structure ==
SWAP proteins share a colinearly arrayed series of novel sequence motifs. This means that they have been conserved over time. The SWAP protein in different organisms share some similarity in terms of sequence and may have been related at some point in evolutionary history.
