= U6 spliceosomal RNA =

Small nuclear RNA component of the spliceosome

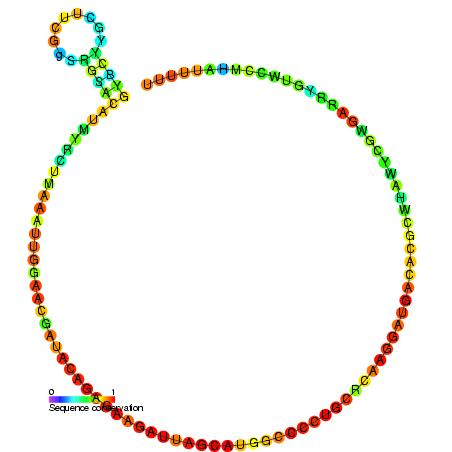
- Predicted secondary structure and sequence conservation of U6

Identifiers
- Symbol: RNU6-1
- Alt. Symbols: U6, U6-1, RNU6A
- Rfam: RF00026

Other data
- RNA type: Gene; snRNA; splicing
- Domain: Eukaryota
- GO: GO:0000351 GO:0000353 GO:0030621 GO:0005688 GO:0046540
- SO: SO:0000396
- PDB structures: PDBe

U6 snRNA is the non-coding small nuclear RNA (snRNA) component of U6 snRNP (small nuclear ribonucleoprotein), an RNA-protein complex that combines with other snRNPs, unmodified pre-mRNA, and various other proteins to assemble a spliceosome, a large RNA-protein molecular complex that catalyzes the excision of introns from pre-mRNA. Splicing, or the removal of introns, is a major aspect of post-transcriptional modification and takes place only in the nucleus of eukaryotes.

The RNA sequence of U6 is the most highly conserved across species of all five of the snRNAs involved in the spliceosome, suggesting that the function of the U6 snRNA has remained both crucial and unchanged through evolution.

It is common in vertebrate genomes to find many copies of the U6 snRNA gene or U6-derived pseudogenes. This prevalence of "back-ups" of the U6 snRNA gene in vertebrates further implies its evolutionary importance to organism viability.

The U6 snRNA gene has been isolated in many organisms, including C. elegans. Among them, baker's yeast (Saccharomyces cerevisiae) is a commonly used model organism in the study of snRNAs.

The structure and catalytic mechanism of U6 snRNA resembles that of domain V of group II introns. The formation of the triple helix in U6 snRNA is deemed to be important in splicing activity, where its role is to bring the catalytic site to the splice site.

== Role ==
Base-pair specificity of the U6 snRNA allows the U6 snRNP to bind tightly to the U4 snRNA and loosely to the U5 snRNA of a triple-snRNP during the initial phase of the splicing reaction. As the reaction progresses, the U6 snRNA is unzipped from U4 and binds to the U2 snRNA. At each stage of this reaction, the U6 snRNA secondary structure undergoes extensive conformational changes.

The association of U6 snRNA with the 5' end of the intron via base-pairing during the splicing reaction occurs prior to the formation of the lariat (or lasso-shaped) intermediate, and is required for the splicing process to proceed. The association of U6 snRNP with U2 snRNP via base-pairing forms the U6-U2 complex, a structure that comprises the active site of the spliceosome.

== Secondary structure ==
While the putative secondary structure consensus base pairing is confined to a short 5' stem-loop, much more extensive structures have been proposed for specific organisms such as in yeast. In addition to the 5' stem loop, all confirmed U6 snRNAs can form the proposed 3' intramolecular stem loop.

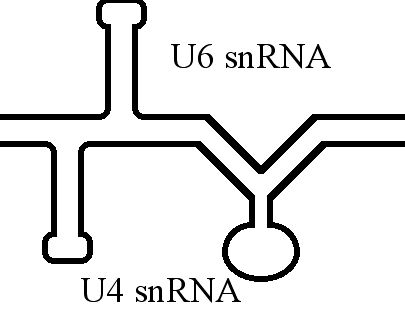
U4/U6 snRNA complex

The U6 snRNA is known to form an extensive base-pair interactions with U4 snRNA. This interaction has been shown to be mutually exclusive to that of the 3' intramolecular stem loop.

== Associated proteins ==
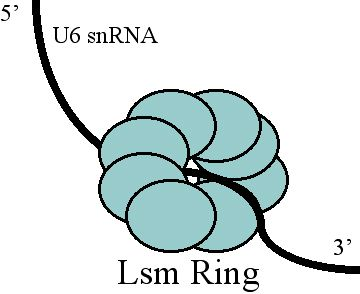
Lsm Binding U6 snRNA

Free U6 snRNA is found to be associated with the proteins Prp24 and the LSms. Prp24 is thought to form an intermediate complex with the U6 snRNA, in order to facilitate the extensive base-pairing between the U4 and U6 snRNAs, and the Lsms may aid in Prp24 binding. The approximate location of these protein binding domains was determined, and the proteins were later visualized by electron microscopy. This study suggests that in the free form of U6, Prp24 binds to the telestem and the uridine-rich 3' tail of the U6 snRNA is threaded through the ring of Lsms. Another important NTC-related protein associated with U6 is Cwc2, which by interaction with important catalytic RNA elements induces the formation of a functional catalytic core in the spliceosome. Cwc2 and U6 achieve formation of this complex by interaction with the ISL and regions located near the 5' splice site.

== See also ==
- U6atac minor spliceosomal RNA
