= U6atac minor spliceosomal RNA =

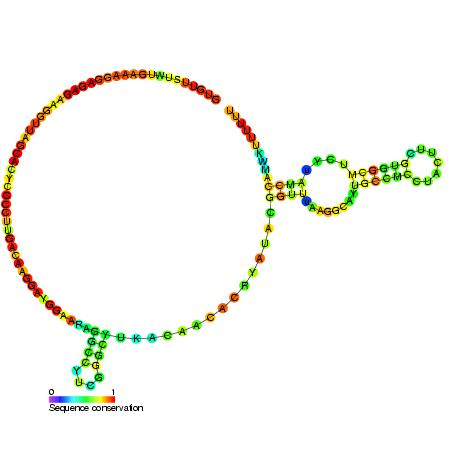
- Predicted secondary structure and sequence conservation of U6atac

Identifiers
- Symbol: RNU6ATAC
- Alt. Symbols: U6atac, RNU6ATAC1
- Rfam: RF00619

Other data
- RNA type: Gene; snRNA; splicing
- Domain: Eukaryota
- GO: GO:0000355 GO:0000369 GO:0030622 GO:0030627 GO:0005691
- SO: SO:0000274
- PDB structures: PDBe

U6atac minor spliceosomal RNA is a non-coding RNA which is an essential component of the minor U12-type spliceosome complex. The U12-type spliceosome is required for removal of the rarer class of eukaryotic introns (AT-AC, U12-type).

U6atac snRNA is proposed to form a base-paired complex with another spliceosomal RNA U4atac via two stem loop regions. These interacting stem loops have been shown to be required for in vivo splicing. U6atac is the functional analog of U6 spliceosomal RNA in the major U2-type spliceosomal complex.
