= Small nucleolar RNA SNORD29 =

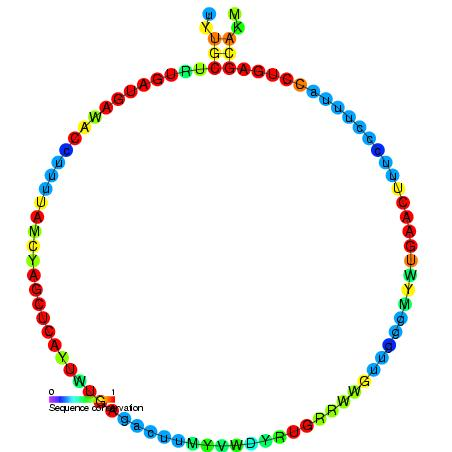
- Predicted secondary structure and sequence conservation of SNORD29

Identifiers
- Symbol: SNORD29
- Alt. Symbols: U29
- Rfam: RF00070

Other data
- RNA type: Gene; snRNA; snoRNA; C/D-box
- Domain: Eukaryota
- GO: GO:0006396 GO:0005730
- SO: SO:0000593
- PDB structures: PDBe

In molecular biology, SNORD29 (also known as U29) is a non-coding RNA (ncRNA) molecule which functions in the modification of other small nuclear RNAs (snRNAs). This type of modifying RNA is usually located in the nucleolus of the eukaryotic cell which is a major site of snRNA biogenesis. It is known as a small nucleolar RNA (snoRNA) and also often referred to as a guide RNA.

U29 belongs to the C/D box class of snoRNAs which contain the conserved sequence motifs known as the C box (UGAUGA) and the D box (CUGA). Most of the members of the box C/D family function in directing site-specific 2'-O-methylation of substrate RNAs.

In humans U29 and several other snoRNAs (U22 and U25-U31) are located in the introns of the same gene (called UHG for U22 host gene). U29 is proposed to guide the 2'O-ribose methylation of 28S ribosomal RNA (rRNA) residue A4493.
