= Influenza virus pseudoknot =

Influenza pseudoknot
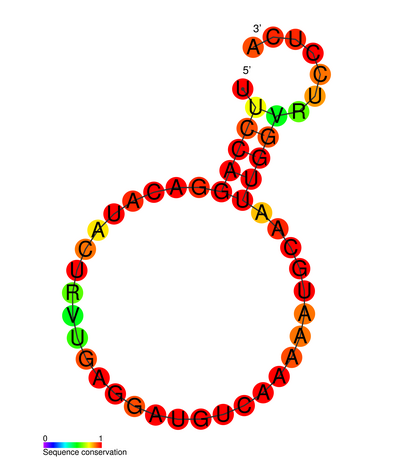
- The consensus secondary structure of the Influenza pseudoknot family of RNA motifs

Identifiers
- Symbol: PK-IAV
- Rfam: RF01099

Other data
- RNA type: Cis-reg
- Domain: Orthomyxoviridae;
- PDB structures: PDBe

The Influenza virus pseudoknot is an RNA pseudoknot structure formed in one of the non-structural coding segments (NS) of influenza virus genome. Pseudoknots are commonly found in viral genomes, especially RNA viruses, where they incorporate an RNA splice site and can have a wide range of functions. The orientation of the coaxially stacked stems in the influenza pseudoknot, however, differs from the most common topology in "classical" RNA pseudoknots.

The pseudoknot structure is very similar in influenzavirus A and influenzavirus B. A unique point mutation occurring in the strains of influenza A virus subtype H5N1 after 2001 has been suggested to result in RNA conformational shift, favouring an alternative hairpin structure instead of the pseudoknot.

Another pseudoknot occurs at the Influenza A Segment 7 Splice Site, which is used to produce the important viral M2 ion channel protein. Both pseudoknots have the possibility of alternating between hairpin loop and pseudoknot conformations, which place splicing regulatory motifs in different structural contexts.

== See also ==
- Non-coding RNA
