= Douglas H. Turner =

American chemist

- Website: http://rna.chem.rochester.edu/

Douglas "Doug" H. Turner is an American chemist and Professor of Chemistry at the University of Rochester.

== Early life ==
Turner grew up in Brooklyn, New York.

== Education ==
Turner attended Harvard College, where he graduated cum laude in Chemistry and was commissioned as a Second Lieutenant in the U.S. Army. He did his graduate work in the Chemistry Departments of Columbia University and Brookhaven National Labs, where he worked with George Flynn and Norman Sutin to develop the Raman laser temperature jump method for measuring kinetics on a nanosecond time scale. During this period, he also spent three months in Anniston, Alabama taking the Officer's Basic Course of the Army's Chemical Corp. Deciding that he liked science more than war, he turned down the opportunity to continue as an active duty officer and went to the University of California at Berkeley to postdoc with Ignacio Tinoco, Jr. There, he invented fluorescence detected circular dichroism for measuring the optical activity of the fluorescent component of a solution.

== Professional life and scientific achievements ==
In 1975, Turner joined the faculty of the Chemistry Department at the University of Rochester, where he is still a Professor. Turner was also lucky to be part of the academic family of Tom Cech (Nobel Prize in Chemistry, 1989) during 2 sabbatical years at the University of Colorado at Boulder. Turner has been unusually lucky with his own academic family of 8 postdocs, 49 students who have graduated with Ph.D.'s, and his other collaborators. Together, they have discovered many of the fundamental principles that determine RNA structure. These principles, occasionally dubbed "Turner Rules", are used in many RNA structure prediction algorithms. This has helped advance methods for predicting RNA structure from sequence, as well as RNA-RNA interactions: e.g. miRNA or siRNA target binding. Methods using the "Turner Rules" are widely used by biochemists and biologists. In his own lab, these methods were used to discover potentially medically important RNA structures in influenza virus including an RNA pseudoknot that may play a role in regulating splicing at the Influenza A Segment 7 3' Splice Site.

Recently, Turner and collaborators have used Nuclear Magnetic Resonance and Molecular Dynamics simulations of short RNAs to test understanding of the sequence dependence of stacking interactions. Much remains to be discovered.

Papers coauthored by Turner have been cited over 20,000 times (Google Scholar). The work has also been recognized by Sloan and Guggenheim Fellowships, election as a Fellow of the American Association for the Advancement of Science (AAAS), selection by the American Chemical Society as a Gordon Hammes Lecturer, continuous funding of an NIH grant from 1976 to 2019, and coauthorship of more than 250 papers. With Ryszard Kierzek from the Institute of Bioorganic Chemistry in Poznan, he shared the AAAS Poland-US Science Award in 2016. In 2023 Turner won the RNA Society / Cold Spring Harbor Laboratory Press "Distinguished Research Mentor Award.”

Turner has also served the scientific community by often teaching the first year undergraduate Chemistry course and the graduate Biophysical Chemistry course, by being a member of several NIH Study Sections, the Advisory Board of the Institute of Bioorganic Chemistry in Poznan, and the editorial board of the Biophysical Journal. He also co-chaired a Nucleic Acids Gordon Conference.
