= SsNA-helicase RNA motif =

ssNA-helicase
- Consensus secondary structure and sequence conservation of ssNA-helicase RNA

Identifiers
- Symbol: ssNA-helicase
- Rfam: RF03070

Other data
- RNA type: Gene; sRNA
- SO: SO:0001263
- PDB structures: PDBe

The ssNA-helicase RNA motif is a conserved RNA structure that was discovered by bioinformatics. Although the ssNA-helicase motif was published as an RNA candidate, there is some reason to suspect that it might function as a single-stranded DNA. In terms of secondary structure, RNA and DNA are difficult to distinguish when only sequence information is available.

ssNA-helicase motif RNAs are found in Bacillota and Actinomycetota. The ssNA-helicase motif occurs upstream of genes that likely function as helicases, possible on an RNA substrate. Some evidence suggests that these genes are part of single-stranded RNA viruses (or presumably phages, as the RNAs are located in bacterial sequences). However, there is also a suggestion of an association with singled-stranded DNA viruses that infect plants. This latter potential association could mean that the ssNA-helicase motif actually functions as singled-stranded DNA. If the RNA is indeed part of a phage, then its location upstream of a protein-coding gene might just reflect the typical gene organization of phages, and not a direct functional or regulatory association between the RNA and the downstream gene. Therefore, it is ambiguous whether ssNA-helicase motif examples function as cis-regulatory elements or whether they operate in trans, and also whether they function as RNA or DNA.
