= Influenza A segment 7 splice site =

Influenza A Segment 7 Splice Site

Identifiers
- Symbol: IAVS7SS

Other data
- RNA type: Cis-reg
- Domain: Orthomyxoviridae;
- PDB structures: PDBe

The 3' splice site of the influenza A virus segment 7 pre-mRNA can adopt two different types of RNA structure: a pseudoknot and a hairpin. This conformational switch is proposed to play a role in RNA alternative splicing and may influence the production of M1 and M2 proteins produced by splicing of this pre-mRNA.

== Overview ==
Figure 1. Diagram of the influenza segment 7 transcript showing the open reading frames for M1 and the spliced M2 proteins. Below left is the hairpin conformation while below right is the pseudoknot. The branch point is annotated in purple, the polypyrimidine tract in blue, the 3' splice site with a red arrow and the SF2/ASF exonic enhancer site in orange

This structured region was first discovered in a bioinformatics survey of influenza A based on thermodynamic folding free energy and amino acid codon suppression. Initial models of the secondary structure were based on computational methods for Nucleic acid structure prediction. The hairpin conformation was predicted using RNAalifold, while the pseudoknot was predicted with DotKnot.

Segment 7 encodes the M1 protein and the smaller M2 proton channel protein, which is produced by RNA splicing. M2 protein is critical to the virus: it forms the ion channels that allow for acidification of the virion that stimulates in un-coating. The 3' splice site region used to produce M2 was experimentally probed with structure-sensitive chemicals and enzymes and was found to adopt both the hairpin and pseudoknot conformations in solution. Each conformation places important splicing regulatory sites in different structural environments, which has implications for the modulation of splicing of the segment 7 transcript. For example, the splice site, polypyrimidine tract, branch point, and ASF/SF2 exonic enhancer binding sites are expected to be more accessible in the hairpin conformation and less accessible in the pseudoknot (Figure 1). By shifting the equilibrium between the pseudoknot and hairpin it may be possible to reduce or enhance M2 splicing, respectively.

== Potentially shared mechanism ==
This putative mechanism may also be one that is common to spliced influenza transcripts. A similarly placed, but structurally distinct, influenza virus pseudoknot/hairpin was also described in the 3' splice site of segment 8 transcripts, which encode the NP and, by splicing, NEP proteins. These structures form a family of structured RNAs shared between influenza A and influenza B

== Host species specific structural stability ==
The 3' splice site structures in influenza A segment 7 show host-species specific trends in structural stability. The greatest number of structurally stabilizing mutations occur in avian specific strains, while the most structurally destabilizing mutations occurred in human strains: swine fell in between. This general trend in stability: avian, swine, human, roughly follows the temperatures at which the influenza virus reproduces within each host species. The temperatures of the avian gut and the swine and human lung are 42, 37, and 34 degrees Celsius, respectively. This observation is a local instance of a global trend in influenza A coding sequences, where avian, swine, and human strains show different stability. It may be the case that RNA structure is more stable in hosts where the replication temperature is high in order to preserve functional structures or important structural equilibria.

== See also ==
- pseudoknot
- Non-coding RNA
- Nucleic acid secondary structure
