= Prevotella-2 RNA motif =

Prevotella-2
- Consensus secondary structure and sequence conservation of Prevotella-2 RNA

Identifiers
- Symbol: Prevotella-2
- Rfam: RF03043

Other data
- RNA type: Gene; sRNA
- SO: SO:0001263
- PDB structures: PDBe

The Prevotella-2 RNA motif is a conserved RNA structure that was discovered by bioinformatics. Energetically stable tetraloops often occur in this motif. Prevotella-2 motif RNAs are found in the bacterial genus Prevotella.

Nearly all Prevotella-2 RNAs occur upstream of genes that encode sodium/proton antiporters. These data suggest that the RNAs function as cis-regulatory elements. However, one Prevotella-2 RNA is located upstream of a gene encoded on the opposite DNA strand, which would be unlikely for a cis-regulatory function in bacteria. Therefore, it is also possible that Prevotella-2 RNAs are small RNAs that operate in trans. In this model, their association with sodium/proton antiporters would be a coincidence. Most Prevotella-2 RNAs are followed by a Rho-independent transcription terminator. If the RNAs function in cis, these transcript terminators might be a part of the mechanism used to achieve gene regulation. If, on the other hand, Prevotella-2 RNAs correspond to small RNAs, the terminators may simply terminate the transcript containing this non-coding RNA.
