= Proteo-phage-1 RNA motif =

Proteo-phage-1
- Consensus secondary structure and sequence conservation of Proteo-phage-1 RNA

Identifiers
- Symbol: Proteo-phage-1
- Rfam: RF03044

Other data
- RNA type: Gene; sRNA
- SO: SO:0001263
- PDB structures: PDBe

The Proteo-phage-1 RNA motif is a conserved RNA structure that was discovered by bioinformatics. Energetically stable tetraloops often occur in this motif.

Proteo-phage-1 motif RNAs are found in Pseudomonadota. Nearby to most Proteo-phage-1 motif RNAs are genes that are typical of phages. This, in turn, suggests that Proteo-phage-1 motif RNAs are found in prophages, and presumably also used by phage particles, although Proteo-phage-1 motif RNAs have not been observed in genome sequences of purified phages. It is ambiguous whether Proteo-phage-1 RNAs function as cis-regulatory elements or whether they operate in trans.
