= RNA CoSSMos =

Content
- Description: Secondary Structure Motifs in RNA

Contact
- Research center: Saint Louis University
- Laboratory: Department of Chemistry
- Authors: Pamela L. Vanegas Graham A. Hudson Brent M. Znosko
- Primary citation: Vanegas & al. (2012)
- Release date: 2011

Access
- Website: https://www.rnacossmos.com/

The RNA Characterization of Secondary Structure Motifs database (RNA CoSSMos) is a repository of three-dimensional nucleic acid PDB structures containing secondary structure motifs (loops, hairpin loops ...).

== See also ==
- Nucleic acid secondary structure
