= IS605-orfB RNA motifs =

IS605-orfB RNA motifs refer to conserved RNA or DNA structures that were discovered by bioinformatics. Although such motifs were published as a RNA candidates, there is some reason to suspect that they might function as a single-stranded DNA. In terms of secondary structure, RNA and DNA are difficult to distinguish when only sequence information is available. If the motifs function as RNA, they likely are small RNAs, that are independently transcribed.

Two specific motifs are known: the IS605-orfB-I RNA motif and the IS605-orfB-II RNA motif. The conserved features of these motifs, including their secondary structures are dissimilar, and it appears that the two motifs are not structurally related.

IS605-orfB-I RNAs are found in organisms classified within the genus Enterococcus, while IS605-orfB-II RNAs have not yet (as of 2018) been detected in any classified organism. IS605-orfB-II RNAs are, thus far, only found in metagenomic sequences.

Both motifs are usually located with transposase-encoding genes related to the IS605 family. The motifs appear 3′ to these genes. Although transposase genes are often associated with inverted repeats that are a product of their transposition mechanism, both specific RNA/DNA motifs are more complicated than the simple, apparent stemloop structure that inverted repeats exhibit.

It is because of this association with transposase genes that IS605-orfB RNA motifs might function as single-stranded DNA. IS605 transposases undergo a single-stranded intermediate stage during transposition, and it is possible that the motifs are functional during this stage.
