= Kissing stem-loop =

An example of an RNA stem-loop. If now a second RNA stem-loop has complementary base-sequence, the two loops can base pair resulting in a kissing loop.

This animated GIF shows two RNA loops (orange and green) bind to each other in a structure called a kissing loop. The two RNA loops interact through stacking interactions and through hydrogen bonding (interacting bases shown in space-filling representation).

In genetics, a kissing stem-loop, or kissing stem loop interaction, is formed in ribonucleic acid (RNA) when two bases between two hairpin loops pair. These intra- and intermolecular kissing interactions are important in forming the tertiary or quaternary structure of many RNAs.

RNA kissing interactions, also called loop-loop pseudoknots, occur when the unpaired nucleotides in one hairpin loop, base pair with the unpaired nucleotides in another hairpin loop. When the hairpin loops are located on separate RNA molecules, their intermolecular interaction is called a kissing complex. These interactions generally form between stem-loops. However, stable complexes have been observed containing only two intermolecular Watson–Crick base pairs.

== Biological significance ==
RNA molecules perform their function in living cells by adopting specific and highly complex 3-dimensional structures. It is believed that recombination may be initiated by the kissing loops. Recombination is critical to successful evolution, especially in the adaptation and survival of viruses.

=== In retroviruses ===
Retroviruses are viruses that silently replicate inside a host, keeping it alive until the replication is completed and the host is no longer needed. The genomic RNA of retroviruses is linked non-covalently to the dimer linkage structure (DLS), a non-coding region in the 5' UTR. For the kissing loop interaction to occur, there is a triple interaction that involves a 5'-flanking purine and 2 centralized bases in the complementary strand. This interaction transcripts in the major groove of the kissing loop dimer.

The human immunodeficiency virus (HIV) is a retrovirus that can be transmitted via the interactions of bodily fluids. There are two types of HIV viruses, human immunodeficiency virus type 1 (HIV-1) and human immunodeficiency virus type 2 (HIV-2). From the two types of the Human Immunodeficiency Virus strain, HIV-1 is the most common strain. The RNA of the HIV-1 virus uses the kissing stem loop interaction as a means of recognition, the main step of interaction of the dimerization initiation site (DIS) to form the duplex. To study the kissing stem-loop loop interaction, It was seen that the Dimerization initiation site (DIS) complex was essential to the replication of the HIV type 1 virus in the eukaryotic cell, and any changes to the stem loop structure diminished the dimerization interaction. Experimentally, it has been seen that, in vivo, mutating the Dimerization initiation site (DIS) obstructed the dimerization of the DIS complex.

=== Plasmid maintenance ===
The kissing complex is composed of two hairpin loops that function as a regulator of CoLE1 plasmid in the E. coli bacteria. This regulation happens when the antisense RNA of E. coli and RNA primer responsible for DNA replication hybridizes to form the kissing complex.

== See also ==
- Adaptation
- Nucleic acid tertiary structure
- Pseudoknot
- RNA
- Stem-loop
- Three prime untranslated region
