= DiProDB =

DiProDB: a database for dinucleotide properties.

Content
- Description: DiProDB: a database for dinucleotide properties.

Contact
- Laboratory: Fritz Lipmann Institute
- Primary citation: PMID 18805906
- Release date: 2008

Access
- Website: http://diprodb.fli-leibniz.de

DiProDB is a database designed to collect and analyse thermodynamic, structural and other dinucleotide properties.

== See also ==
- Protein database (disambiguation)
