= Long range pseudoknots =

Long range pseudoknot
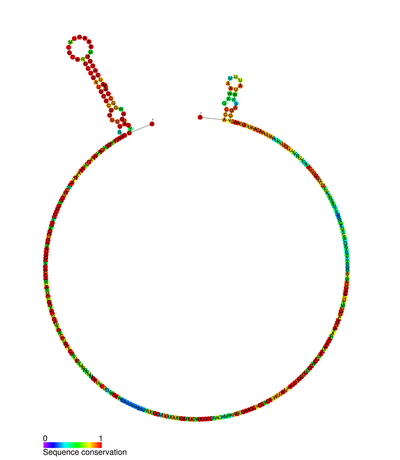
- Secondary structure of the long range pseudoknot

Identifiers
- Rfam: RF01086

Other data
- RNA type: Cis-reg
- Domain: Eukaryote Prokaryote
- PDB structures: PDBe

A long range pseudoknot is a pseudoknot containing a long loop region, and may be a mechanism of translational control.

A long range pseudoknot is thought to negatively regulate the translation of the IF3-L35-L20 operon in E. coli. This operon encodes the translation initiation factor IF-3 and ribosomal proteins L35 and L20. In this example, the RNA-RNA interaction occurs between nucleotides separated by a 300 nucleotide loop region.

A long range pseudoknot is also believed to be required for the activity of the Neurospora VS ribozyme.
