= Rational design =

Technique in chemical biology

In chemical biology and biomolecular engineering, rational design (RD) is an umbrella term which invites the strategy of creating new molecules with a certain functionality, based upon the ability to predict how the molecule's structure (specifically derived from motifs) will affect its behavior through physical models. This can be done either from scratch or by making calculated variations on a known structure, and usually complements directed evolution.

== Applications ==
As an example, rational design is used to decipher collagen stability, mapping ligand-receptor interactions, unveiling protein folding and dynamics, and creating extra-biological structures by using fluorinated amino acids. To treat cancer, rational design is used for targeted therapies where proteins are engineered to modify the communication of cells with their environment. There is also the rational design of alfa-alkyl auxin molecules, which are auxin analogs capable of binding and blocking the formation of the hormone receptor complex.

Other applications of rational design include:

- Protein design
- Nucleic acid design
- Drug design
- Pathway design
