= Protein database =

Protein database may refer to:

- Any protein structure database
- Any protein sequence database

Exact names

- "Protein" database of the National Institute of Health
- Protein Database of Bio-Synthesis, Inc.
