= Bio-Synthesis, Inc. =

- Type: Private
- Industry: Biotechnology
- Founded: 1984
- Headquarters: Lewisville, Texas, U.S.
- Key people: Miguel Castro, PhD - Founder & CEO; Jessica Chen - Co-Founder & VP
- Products: custom and catalog peptides, antibodies, organic synthesis, custom oligos, gene synthesis, large scale oligonucleotide synthesis, peptide protein sequencing, analytical services; Clean Compare - DNA and Protein Sequence Comparison Tool; Peptide-Antigen Finder - Peptide Finder for Antibodies and Drugs; Peptide Library Design Tools - Can screen highly active compounds such as antigenic peptides, receptor ligands, antimicrobial compounds, and enzyme inhibitors. Oligo Design and Analysis Tools - Oligo calculator and analyzer, antisense design, dilution, resuspension. Protein Hydroplotter - Distinguishes Protein Hydrophilic and Hydrophobic Regions
- Website: https://www.biosyn.com

Bio-Synthesis, Inc. (BSI) is a biotechnology company headquartered in Lewisville, Texas. It is a provider of custom and catalog peptides, custom oligos, antibodies, organic synthesis, and analytical services. Biomedical researchers worldwide in universities, biotech companies, private clinics, and government agencies use products from Bio-Synthesis, Inc. in studies ranging from PCR diagnostics to cancer research and the Human Genome Project.

== History ==
=== 1984–1994: Founding ===
Founded in 1984, Bio-Synthesis, Inc. was known as OCS Laboratories and was one of the first companies providing commercially available synthetic oligonucleotides to the biomedical research community worldwide.

It was the first producer of commercially available synthetic DNA and became a producer of synthetic peptides in 1985, and became the only company to provide both synthetic DNA and peptide under one roof. Also in 1985 the process, now known as PCR, was discovered by Mullis et al. A key activity for Bio-Synthesis was to synthesize large number of PCR primer thus assisting and solidifying the early adoption of this now common and crucial process in biology.

In 1988, Bio-Synthesis helped in the synthesis and characterization of a new class of peptides with novel antimicrobial properties discovered at the NIH.

An early Bio-Synthesis logo used from 1988 to 2008

In 1989, OCS became incorporated as Bio-synthesis, Inc. and moved its laboratories to Lewisville, Texas.

In 1993, Bio-Synthesis was one of the first peptide synthesis companies to acquire a Finnigan MALDI-TOF mass spectrometer for the accurate quality control of synthetic peptides produced in-house.

In 1994, Bio-synthesis pioneered the use of molecular methods for HLA analysis which is applied in organ matching for transplantation purposes. Later in the same year Bio-Synthesis held the first major HLA DNA typing workshop with the attendance of HLA laboratory directors from around the country in conjunction with University of North Texas in Denton Texas.

=== 1995–2006: DNA identity testing ===
In 1995, Bio-Synthesis, Inc. introduced DNA identity testing to its broad range of molecular diagnostic services. Today, the DNA Identity Testing Center of BSI uses advanced techniques and automated systems to produce the most accurate DNA testing results allowed by current scientific technologies. The DNA Identity Testing Center has its own staff of scientific professionals whose focus is to ensure the quality and integrity of all tests and services.

In 2000, Bio-Synthesis, Inc. perform the genetic analysis close to 500 Chinese nationals that were soliciting, under the right of abode, the right to move to Hong Kong by proving that their biological fathers were Hong Kong residents.

=== 2007–present: Software tools ===
In June 2007, Bio-Synthesis, Inc. unveiled a new online software tool called Protein Lounge which brought all of the vital and necessary databases to one place. The Protein Database contained all of the necessary information for proteins, such as datasheets, reviews, signaling pathway relation, disease relation, sequences, publications and reagent links. The database offered the most comprehensive gene/protein sequence pages which have all pertinent information needed to analyze any sequence.^{1}

In January 2008, Bio-Synthesis, Inc. announced an exclusive scientific collaboration with Dr. Dante Marciani, a world-renowned expert in immune agonists. The collaboration was focused on proprietary novel glycosides that stimulate innate immunity while taking advantage of the synergistic effects between innate and adaptive immunity. In addition, the collaboration extended to proprietary compounds that down regulate The immunity, an area of significance in the treatment of chronic inflammatory conditions. ^{2}

In May 2009, Bio-Synthesis, Inc. began Mitochondrial, or DNA, testing and offered it commercially. The DNA Identity Testing Laboratory at Bio-Synthesis, Inc. (BSI) is currently sequencing DNA samples for maternal lineage and criminal investigations.^{3}

In February 2010, Bio-synthesis has been awarded a 2-year, $590,000, Small Business and Innovation Research (SBIR) Phase 1 grant from the National Institute of Allergy and Infectious Diseases (NIAID) of the National Institutes of Health (NIH). The company will use the proceeds to further the development of its proprietary adjuvants or immune agonists that carry in a single molecule the various determinants needed to stimulate both innate and adaptive immunities, causing synergistic effects on T cell immunity.

In March 2010, Bio-Synthesis launched a new custom service, PenetraINS, whereby two different molecules are joined together via selective chemical coupling for the purpose of up or down regulating gene expression in mammalian organisms.
