= Automatic layout =

Feature of some graph drawing tools

Automatic layout is an option in graph drawing toolkits that allow to lay out the Graph according to specific rules, such as:

- reducing the length of the arcs between the Graph vertices
- reduce the number of edges crossing (to improve the graph readability)

== See also ==
- Methods in graph drawing
