= Tetraloop =

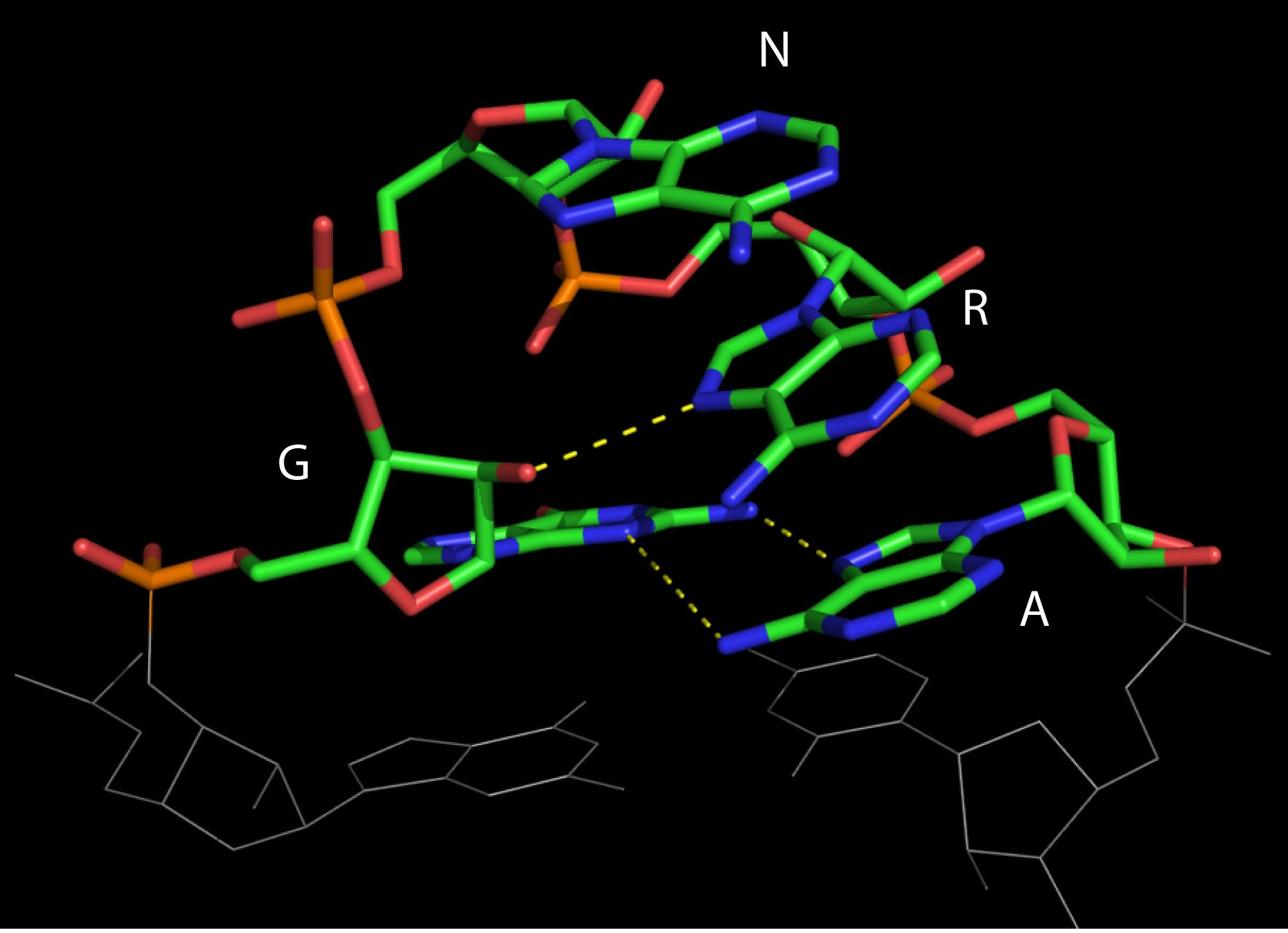
Structure of a GNRA tetraloop from a group I self-splicing intron.

Tetraloops are a type of four-base hairpin loop motifs in RNA secondary structure that cap many double helices. There are many variants of the tetraloop. The published ones include ANYA, CUYG, GNRA, UNAC and UNCG.

Three types of tetraloops are common in ribosomal RNA: GNRA, UNCG and CUUG, in which the N could be either uracil, adenine, cytosine, or guanine, and the R is either guanine or adenine. These three sequences form stable and conserved tetraloops that play an important role in structural stability and biological function of 16S rRNA.

== GNRA ==
The GNRA tetraloop has a guanine-adenine base-pair where the guanine is 5' to the helix and the adenine is 3' to the helix. Tetraloops with the sequence UMAC have essentially the same backbone fold as the GNRA tetraloop, but may be less likely to form tetraloop-receptor interactions. They may therefore be a better choice for closing stems when designing artificial RNAs.

The presence of the GNRA tetraloop provides an exceptional stability to RNA structure. GNRA occurs 50% more than other tetranucleotides due to their ability to withstand temperatures 4 °C higher than other RNA hairpins. This allows them to act as nucleation sites for proper folding of RNA. The rare hydrogen bonds between the first guanine and fourth adenine nucleotide, extensive stacking of nucleotide bases and hydrogen bonds between 2' OH of a ribose sugar and nitrogenous bases makes the tetraloop thermodynamically stable.

== UNCG ==
In the UNCG is favorable thermodynamically and structurally due to hydrogen bonding, van der Waals interactions, coulombic interactions and the interactions between the RNA and the solvent. The UNCG tetraloops are more stable than DNA loops with the same sequence. The UUCG tetraloop is the most stable tetraloop. UUCG and GNRA tetraloops make up 70% of all tetraloops in 16S-rRNA .

== CUUG ==
The CUUG tetraloop has the highest likelihood of conformational changes due to its structural flexibility. Out of the three tetraloops mentioned, this tetraloop is the most flexible since the second uracil is comparatively unrestricted. It is also very thermodynamically stable.

== See also ==
- RNA tertiary structure (section Tetraloop-receptor interactions)
