= Stem-loop =

Intramolecular base-pairing pattern in RNA and DNA

An example of an RNA stem-loop

Stem-loops are nucleic acid secondary structural elements which form via intramolecular base pairing in single-stranded DNA or RNA. They are also referred to as hairpins or hairpin loops. A stem-loop occurs when two regions of the same nucleic acid strand, usually complementary in nucleotide sequence, base-pair to form a double helix that ends in a loop of unpaired nucleotides. Because they deviate from the traditionally understood helical structure of nucleic acids, they are considered important non-canonical structures.

Stem-loops are most commonly found in RNA, and are a key building block of many RNA secondary structures. Stem-loops can direct RNA folding, protect structural stability for messenger RNA (mRNA), provide recognition sites for RNA binding proteins, and serve as a substrate for enzymatic reactions.

== Formation and stability ==
The formation of a stem-loop is dependent on the stability of the helix and loop regions. The first prerequisite is the presence of a sequence that can fold back on itself to form a paired double helix. The stability of this helix is determined by its length, the number of mismatches or bulges it contains (a small number are tolerable, especially in a long helix), and the base composition of the paired region. Pairings between guanine and cytosine have three hydrogen bonds and are more stable compared to adenine-uracil pairings, which have only two. In RNA, adenine-uracil pairings featuring two hydrogen bonds are equal to the adenine-thymine bond of DNA. Base stacking interactions, which align the pi bonds of the bases' aromatic rings in a favorable orientation, also promote helix formation.

The stability of the loop also influences the formation of the stem-loop structure. Optimal loop length tends to be about 4-8 bases long; loops that are fewer than three bases long are sterically impossible and thus do not form, and large loops with no secondary structure of their own (such as pseudoknot pairing) are unstable. One common loop with the sequence UUCG is known as the "tetraloop," and is particularly stable due to the base-stacking interactions of its component nucleotides. Therefore, such loops can form on the microsecond time scale.

== Structural contexts ==
Stem-loops occur in pre-microRNA structures and most famously in transfer RNA, which contain three true stem-loops and one stem that meet in a cloverleaf pattern. The anticodon that recognizes a codon during the translation process is located on one of the unpaired loops in the tRNA. Two nested stem-loop structures occur in RNA pseudoknots, where the loop of one structure forms part of the second stem.

Many ribozymes also feature stem-loop structures. The self-cleaving hammerhead ribozyme contains three stem-loops that meet in a central unpaired region where the cleavage site lies. The hammerhead ribozyme's basic secondary structure is required for self-cleavage activity.

Hairpin loops are often elements found within the 5′ UTR of prokaryotes. These structures are often bound by proteins or cause the attenuation of a transcript in order to regulate translation.

The mRNA stem-loop structure forming at the ribosome binding site may control an initiation of translation.

Stem-loop structures are also important in prokaryotic rho-independent transcription termination. The hairpin loop forms in an mRNA strand during transcription and causes the RNA polymerase to become dissociated from the DNA template strand. This process is known as rho-independent or intrinsic termination, and the sequences involved are called terminator sequences.

== See also ==
- 5′ UTR
- Dyad symmetry
- Inverted repeat
- Kissing stem-loop
- Palindromic sequence
- Repeat sequences
- Satellite DNA
