= Pseudoknot =

Nucleic acid secondary structure

This example of a naturally occurring pseudoknot is found in the RNA component of human telomerase. Sequence from Chen and Greider (2005).

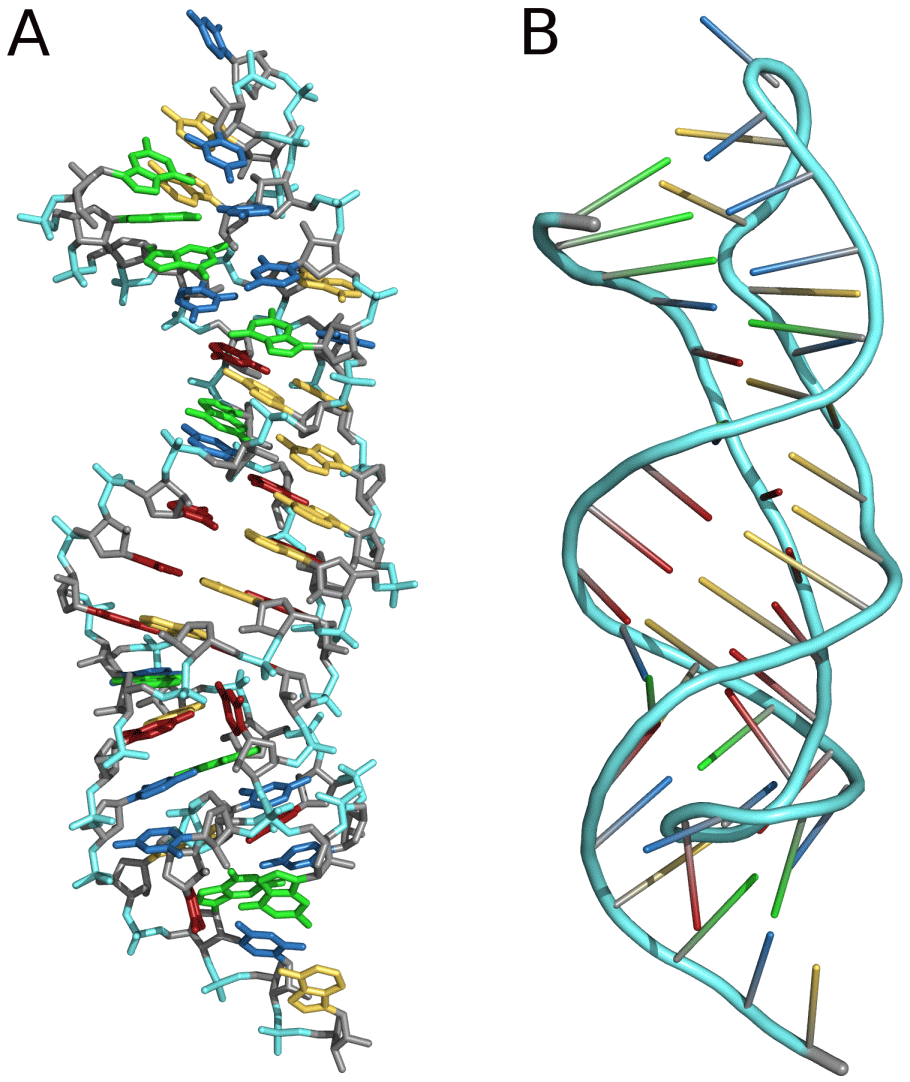
Three dimensional structure of almost the same pseudoknot from telomerase RNA. (A) sticks (B) backbone. The pdb-file is based on PDB: 1YMO. Colors: A U C G

A pseudoknot is a nucleic acid secondary structure containing at least two stem-loop structures in which half of one stem is intercalated between the two halves of another stem. The pseudoknot was first recognized in the turnip yellow mosaic virus in 1982. Pseudoknots fold into knot-shaped three-dimensional conformations but are not true topological knots. These structures are categorized as cross (X) topology within the circuit topology framework, which, in contrast to knot theory, is a contact-based approach.

== Prediction and identification ==
The structural configuration of pseudoknots does not lend itself well to bio-computational detection due to its context-sensitivity or "overlapping" nature. The base pairing in pseudoknots is not well nested; that is, base pairs occur that "overlap" one another in sequence position. This makes the presence of pseudoknots in RNA sequences more difficult to predict by the standard method of dynamic programming, which use a recursive scoring system to identify paired stems and consequently, most cannot detect non-nested base pairs. The newer method of stochastic context-free grammars suffers from the same problem. Thus, popular secondary structure prediction methods like Mfold and Pfold will not predict pseudoknot structures present in a query sequence; they will only identify the more stable of the two pseudoknot stems.

It is possible to identify a limited class of pseudoknots using dynamic programming, but these methods are not exhaustive and scale worse as a function of sequence length than non-pseudoknotted algorithms. The general problem of predicting lowest free energy structures with pseudoknots has been shown to be NP-complete.

== Biological significance ==
Several important biological processes rely on RNA molecules that form pseudoknots, which are often RNAs with extensive tertiary structure. For example, the pseudoknot region of RNase P is one of the most conserved elements in all of evolution. The telomerase RNA component contains a pseudoknot that is critical for activity, and several viruses use a pseudoknot structure to form a tRNA-like motif to infiltrate the host cell.

== Representing pseudoknots ==
Many types of pseudoknots exist, differing by how they cross and how many times they cross. To reflect this difference, pseudoknots are classed into H-, K-, L-, M-types, with each successive type adding a layer of step intercalation. The simple telomerase P2b-P3 example in the article, for example, is an H-type pseudoknot.

RNA secondary structure is usually represented by the dot-bracket notation, with pairing round brackets () indicating basepairs in a stem and dots representing loops. The interrupted stems of pseudoknots mean that such notation must be extended with extra brackets, or even letters, so that different sets of stems can be represented. One such extension uses, in nesting order, ([{<ABCDE for opening and edcba>}]) for closing. The structure for the two (slightly varying) telomerase examples, in this notation, is:

           (((.(((((........))))).))).   ....]]]]]].
drawing  1 CGCGCGCUGUUUUUCUCGCUGACUUUCAGCGGGCGA---AAAAAAUGUCAGCU  50
ALIGN         |.|||||||||||||||||||||||||  .|.|   |||||| ||||||.
1ymo     1 ---GGGCUGUUUUUCUCGCUGACUUUCAGC--CCCAAACAAAAAA-GUCAGCA  47
              ((((((........))))  )).........]]]]]].

Note that U bulge at the end is normally present in telomerase RNA. It was removed in the 1ymo solution model for enhanced stability of the pseudoknot.

== See also ==
- Long range pseudoknots
