= Non-canonical base pairing =

Base pairs in molecular genetics

(A) The three interacting nucleobase edges, (B) canonical base-pair interactions, and (C) the G:U Wobble type non-canonical interaction

Non-canonical base pairs are planar, hydrogen-bonded pairs of nucleobases with hydrogen-bonding patterns that differ from those of standard Watson–Crick base pairs found in the classic double-helical structure of DNA. Although non-canonical pairs can occur in both DNA and RNA, they primarily form stable structures in RNA, where they contribute to its structural diversity and functional complexity. In DNA, such base pairs are typically transient and arise during processes like DNA replication.

Each nucleobase presents a unique distribution of hydrogen bond donors and acceptors across three edges: the Watson–Crick edge, the Hoogsteen edge (or C-H edge in pyrimidines), and the sugar edge. Canonical base pairs form through hydrogen bonding along the Watson–Crick edges, while non-canonical pairs often involve the Hoogsteen or sugar edges.

Common types of non-canonical base pairs in RNA include the G:U wobble pair, sheared G:A pair, reverse Hoogsteen A:U pair, and G:A imino pair. Together, these alternative pairings account for roughly one-third of all base pairs in functional RNA structures. The G:U wobble pair, in particular, is abundant in tRNA anticodon loops and facilitates flexible codon recognition. Sheared G:A and reverse Hoogsteen A:U pairs commonly stabilize loops, junctions, and recurrent 3D motifs such as GNRA tetraloops.

Non-canonical base pairs are often located in loops, bulges, and junctions of RNA, where they help stabilize three-dimensional structures and mediate tertiary interactions. They play critical roles in RNA folding, molecular recognition, and catalysis.

== Importance ==
Non-canonical base pairing is indispensable for RNA's structural and functional versatility, enabling the formation of complex three-dimensional architectures essential for biological activity. These alternative pairings, constituting approximately 33% of base pairs in functional RNA structures, stabilize loops, bulges, and junctions that are interspersed between canonical double-helical regions, facilitating the assembly of intricate tertiary folds. They act as molecular "stitches," connecting disparate structural elements while serving as recognition sites for ligands, proteins, and other RNAs. Critically, non-canonical pairs like G:U wobble and sheared G:A underpin recurrent 3D motifs (e.g., kink-turns) and mediate long-range tertiary contacts through higher-order multiplexes, such as base triples observed in over 10% of RNA base pairs. This geometric diversity allows RNA to adopt conformations crucial for catalysis (ribozymes), genetic regulation (riboswitches), and viral replication mechanisms, as seen in HIV Rev peptide-induced structural rearrangements. Without these interactions, RNA would lack the structural plasticity required for its multifunctional roles in cellular processes.

== Structural background ==
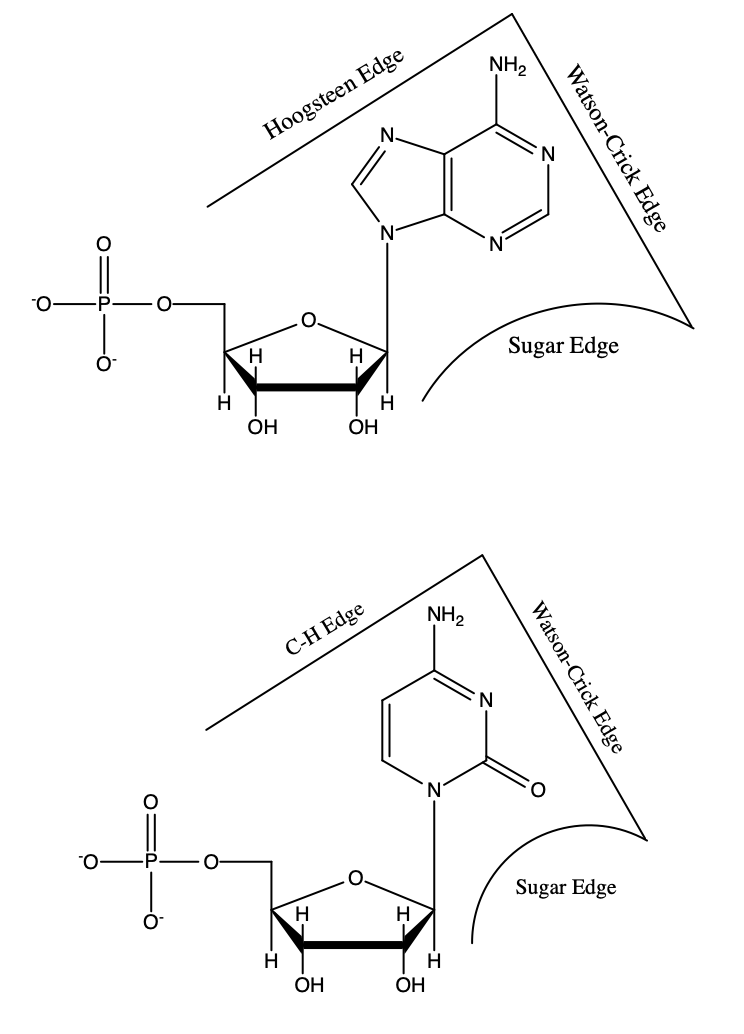
Figure 2: Base pairing edge of nucleobases. Top figure is an example of a purine (Adenine) where the edges are known as Watson-Crick (anti), Hoogsteen (syn), and Sugar Edges. Bottom figure is an example of a Pyrimidine (Cytosine) with the Watson-Crick (anti), C-H (syn), and Sugar Edges

An estimated 60% of bases in structured RNA participate in canonical Watson-Crick base pairs. Base pairing occurs when two bases form hydrogen bonds with each other. These hydrogen bonds can be either polar or non-polar interactions. The polar hydrogen bonds are formed by N-H...O/N and/or O-H...O/N interactions. Non-polar hydrogen bonds are formed between C-H...O/N.

=== Edge interactions ===
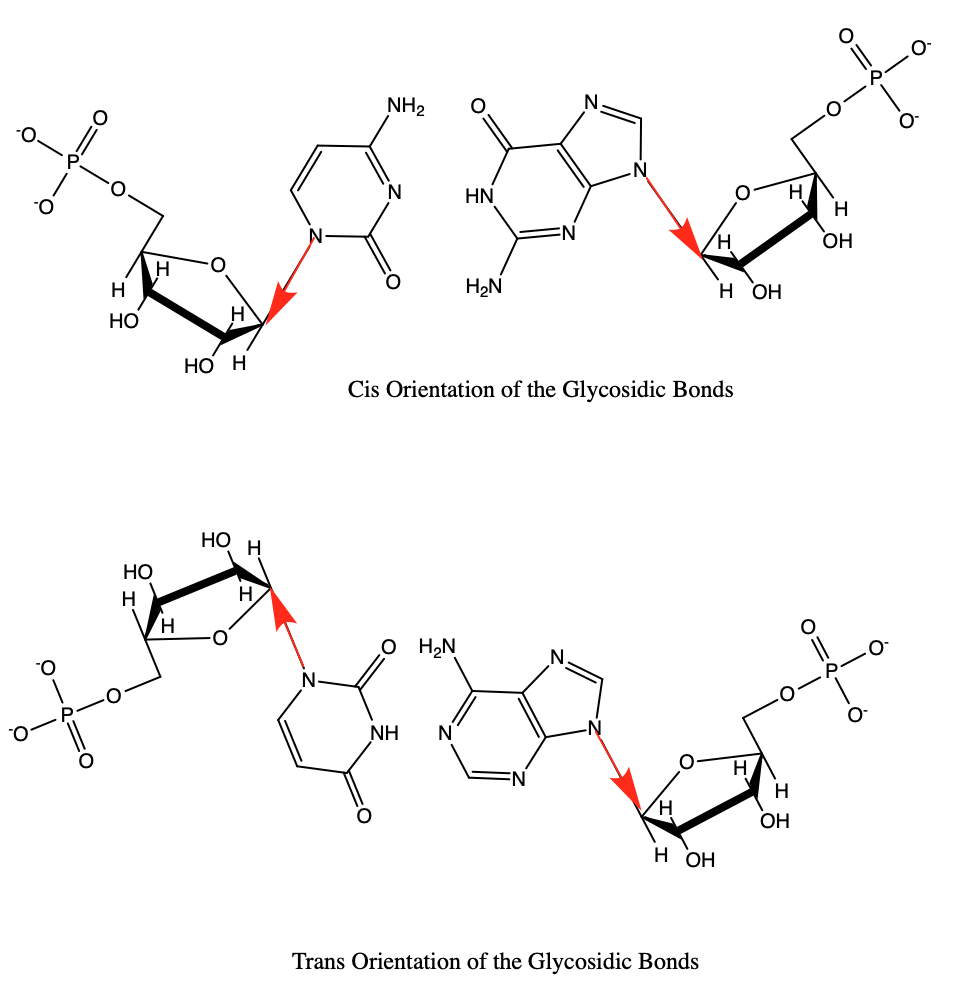
Figure 3: Cis and Trans Orientations of the glycosidic bond in RNA base pairs.

Each base has three potential edges where it can interact with another base. The Purine bases have 3 edges which are able to hydrogen bond. Those are known as the Watson-Crick edge(WC), the Hoogsteen edge(H), and the Sugar edge(S). Pyrimidine bases also have three hydrogen-bonding edges. Like the purine, there is the Watson-Crick edge(WC) and the Sugar edge(S) but the third edge is referred to as the "C-H" edge(H) on the pyrimidine bases. This C-H edge is sometimes also referred to as the Hoogsteen edge for simplicity. The various edges for the purine and pyrimidine bases are shown in Figure 2.

Besides the three edges of interaction, base pairs can also vary in their cis/trans forms. The cis and trans structures depend on the orientation of the ribose sugar as opposed to the hydrogen bond interaction. These various orientations are shown in Figure 3. Therefore, with the cis/trans forms and the 3 hydrogen bond edges, there are 12 basic types of base pairing geometries which can be found in RNA structures. Those 12 types are WC:WC (cis/trans), WC:HC (cis/trans), WC:S (cis/trans), H:S (cis/trans), H:H (cis/trans), and S:S (cis/trans).

=== Common types ===
The most common non-canonical base pairs are trans A:G Hoogsteen/sugar edge, A:U Hoogsteen/WC, and G:U Wobble pairs.

==== Hoogsteen base pairs ====
Figure 5: An example of non-canonical base pairing. Shown is a Hoogsteen AU base pair.

Hoogsteen base pairs occur between adenine (A) and thymine (T); and guanine (G) and cytosine (C); similarly to Watson-Crick base pairs. However, the purine (A and G) takes on an alternative conformation with respect to the pyrimidine. In the A-U Hoogsteen base pair, the adenine is rotated 180° about the glycosidic bond, resulting in an alternative hydrogen bonding scheme which has one hydrogen bond in common with the Watson-Crick base pair (adenine N6 and thymine N4), while the other hydrogen bond, instead of occurring between adenine N1 and thymine N3 as in the Watson-Crick base pair, occurs between adenine N7 and thymine N3 (the Hoogsteen face). The A-U base pair is shown in Figure 5. In the G-C Hoogsteen base pair, like the A-T Hoogsteen base pair, the purine (guanine) is rotated 180° about the glycosidic bond while the pyrimidine (cytosine) remains in place. One hydrogen bond from the Watson-Crick base pair is maintained (guanine O6 and cytosine N4) and the other occurs between guanine N7 and a protonated cytosine N3 (note that the Hoogsteen G-C base pair has two hydrogen bonds, while the Watson-Crick G-C base pair has three).

==== Wobble base pairs ====
Figure 6: Four examples of wobble base pairs.

Wobble base pairing occur between two nucleotides that are not Watson-Crick base pairs and was proposed by Watson in 1966. They occur between the Watson-Crick faces of bases. The 4 main examples are guanine-uracil (G-U), hypoxanthine-uracil (I-U), hypoxanthine-adenine (I-A), and hypoxanthine-cytosine (I-C). These wobble base pairs are very important in tRNA. Most organisms have less than 45 tRNA molecules even though 61 tRNA molecules would technically be necessary to canonically pair to the codon. Wobble base pairing allows for the 5' anticodon to bond to a non-standard base pair. Examples of wobble base pairs are given in Figure 6.

== Classification ==
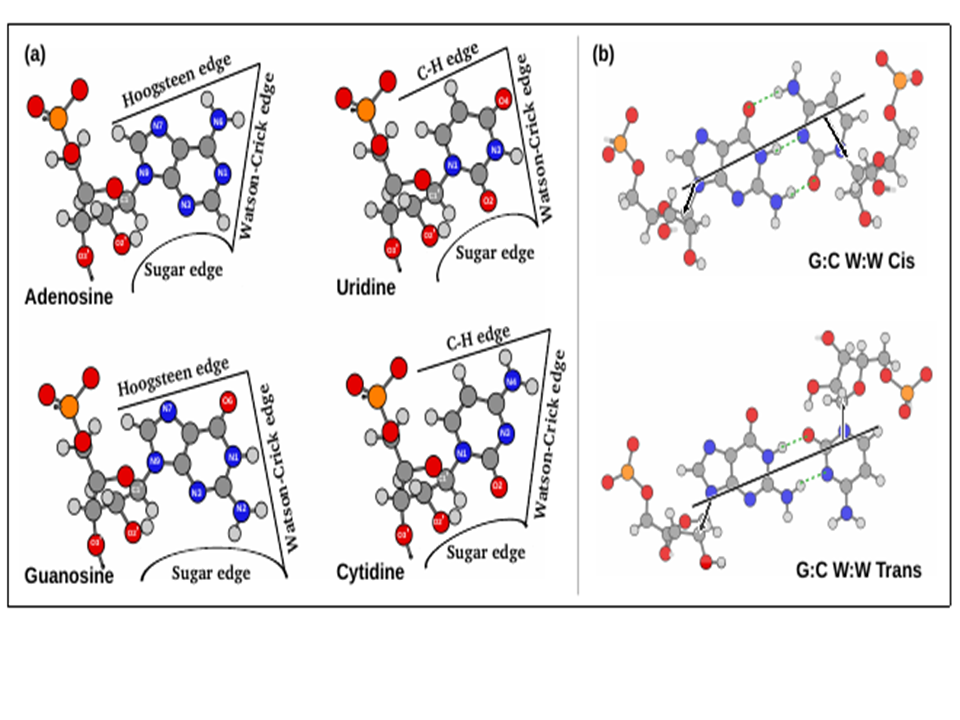
(a) Three hydrogen bonding edges of the four nucleotides (Guanine), showing nomenclature of each edge and (b) Cis and Trans orientations of the sugar moieties of the two nucleotide residues glycosidic bonds of a base pair with respect to hydrogen bonding direction. The arrows in (b) indicate glycosidic bonds as vectors.

Two bases may approach each other in various ways, eventually leading to specific molecular recognition mediated by, often non-canonical, base pairing interactions, in addition to strong stacking interactions. These are essential for the process of RNA single strands folding into three-dimensional structures. Early studies on such unusual base pairs by Jiri Sponer, Pavel Hobza and their group were somewhat disadvantaged due to the unavailability of suitable unambiguous systematic naming schemes. While some of the observed base pair were assigned names following the Saenger nomenclature scheme. others were arbitrarily assigned names by different researchers. It may be mentioned that some attempts were also made by Michael Levitt and coworkers to classify base-base association in terms of adjacency of bases, through either pairing or stacking interactions. There was clearly a need for a classification scheme for different types of non-canonical base pairs, which could comprehensively and unambiguously handle newer variants coming up due to the rapid increase in the sampling space. Different approaches which have evolved in response to this need are described below.

=== Edge families ===
Base Pair Geometries (W = Watson–Crick, H = Hoogsteen, S = Sugar edge)
Interacting Edges	Glycosidic Bond	Nomenclature	Strand Direction
W/W	Cis	cWW	Antiparallel
W/W	Trans	tWW	Parallel
W/H	Cis	cWH	Parallel
W/H	Trans	tWH	Antiparallel
W/S	Cis	cWS	Antiparallel
W/S	Trans	tWS	Parallel
H/H	Cis	cHH	Antiparallel
H/H	Trans	tHH	Parallel
H/S	Cis	cHS	Parallel
H/S	Trans	tHS	Antiparallel
S/S	Cis	cSS	Antiparallel
S/S	Trans	tSS	Parallel

The nucleotide bases are nearly planar heterocyclic moieties, with conjugated pi-electron cloud, and with several hydrogen bonding donors and accepters distributed around the edges, usually designated as W, H or S, based on whether the edges can respectively be involved in forming Watson-Crick base pair, Hoogsteen base pair, or, whether the edge is adjacent to the C2'-OH group of the ribose sugar. Eric Westhof and Neocles Leontis used these edge designations to propose a currently widely accepted nomenclature scheme for base pairs. The hydrogen bonding donor and acceptor atoms could thus be classified in terms of their positioning along their three edges, namely the Watson-Crick or W edge, the Hoogsteen or H edge, and the Sugar or S edge. Since base pairs are mediated through hydrogen bonding interactions based on hydrogen bond donor-acceptor complementarity, this, in turn, provides a convenient bottoms-up approach towards classifying base pair geometries in terms of respective interacting edges of the participating bases. It may be noted that, unlike the Hoogsteen edge of purines, the corresponding edges of the pyrimidine bases do not have any polar hydrogen bond acceptor atom such as N7. However, these bases have C—H groups at their C6 and C5 atoms, which can act as weak hydrogen bond donors, as proposed by Gautam Desiraju. The Hoogsteen edge, hence, is also called Hoogsteen/C-H edge in a unified scheme for designating equivalent positions of purines as well as pyrimidines. Thus, the total number of possible edge combinations involved in base pairing are 6, namely Watson-Crick/Watson-Crick (or W:W), Watson-Crick/Hoogsteen (or W:H), Watson-Crick/Sugar (or W:S), Hoogsteen/Hoogsteen (or H:H), Hoogsteen/Sugar (or H:S) and Sugar/Sugar (or S:S).

In the canonical Watson-Crick base pairs, the glycosidic bonds attaching the N9 (of purine) and N1 (of pyrimidine) of the paired bases with their respective sugar moieties, are on the same side of the mean hydrogen bonding axis, and are hence called Cis Watson-Crick base pairs. However, the relative orientations of the two sugars may also be Trans with respect to the mean hydrogen bonding direction giving rise to a distinct Trans Watson-Crick geometric class, consisting of species which were earlier referred to as reverse Watson-Crick base pairs according to Saenger nomenclature. The possibility of both Cis and Trans glycosidic bond orientation for each of the 6 possible edge combinations, gives rise to 12 geometric families of base pairs (see table).

==== Note on local strand direction ====
It may be noted here that because of the geometric relationship of the bases with the sugar phosphate backbone, these 12 geometric families of base pairs are associated with two possible local strand orientations, namely parallel and antiparallel. For the 6 families with edge combinations involving Watson-Crick and Sugar edges, W:W, W:S and S:S, cis and trans families are respectively associated with antiparallel and parallel 5' to 3' local strand direction. Introduction of the Hoogsteen edge, as one of the partners in the combination, causes an inversion in the relationship. Thus, for W:H and H:S, cis and trans respectively correspond to parallel and antiparallel local strand orientation. As expected, when both the edges are H, a double inversion is observed, and H:H cis and trans correspond respectively to antiparallel and parallel local strand orientations. The annotation of local strand orientation in terms of parallel and antiparallel directions helps to understand which faces of the individual bases can be seen for a given base pair from the 5'- or the 3' sides. This annotation also helps in classifying the 12 geometries into two groups of 6 each, where the geometries can potentially interconvert within each group, by in-plane relative rotation of the bases. However, the above theory is applicable only when the glycosidic torsion angles of both the nucleotide residues are anti. Notably, crystallographic observations and energetic considerations indicate that syn glycosidic torsions are also quite possible. Hence the above classification of parallel or antiparallel nature of strand directions, by itself, does not always provide the complete understanding.

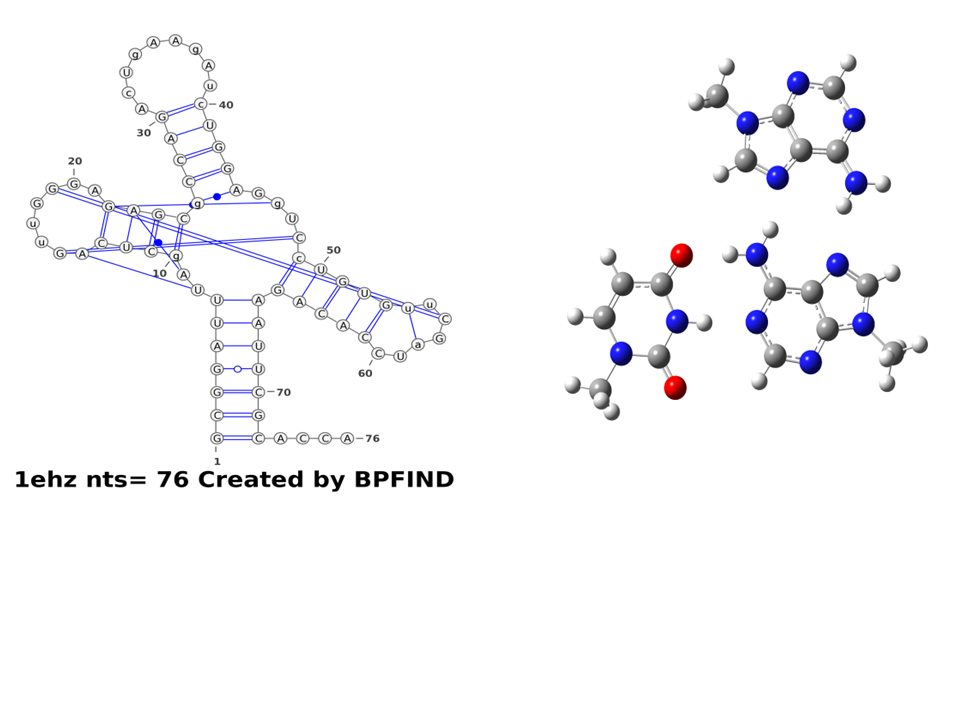
(a) Cloverleaf model of tRNA^{Phe} (picture created by VARNA for PDB: 1EHZ) and (b) A typical base triplet involving residues 9, 12 and 23 of the same tRNA

Various functional RNA molecules are stabilized, in their specific folded pattern, by both canonical as well as non-canonical base pairs. Most tRNA molecules, for example, are known to have four short double helical segments, giving rise to a cloverleaf like two-dimensional structure. The three-dimensional structure of tRNA, however, takes an L-shape. This is mediated by several non-canonical base pairs and base triplets. The D-loop and TψC loop are held together by several such base pairs. There is a variety of non-canonical base pair varieties, which can be browsed through different websites such as NDB, RNABPDB, RNABP COGEST, etc., to get a better understanding.

It may be noted that the above scheme is valid for naturally occurring nucleotide bases. However, there are plenty of examples of post-transcriptional chemical modifications of the bases, many of which are seen in tRNAs or ribosomes. It may be important to understand their structural features also.

=== Subdivision of families ===
These 12 types can be further divided into more subgroups which are dependent on the directionality of the glycosidic bonds and steric extensions.

==== Rigid-body parameter relationships ====
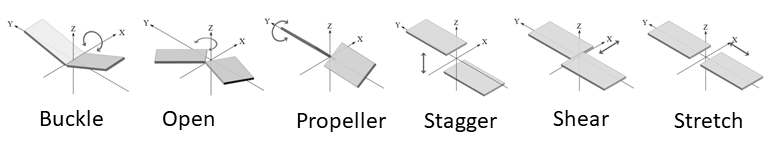
Figure 4: 6 rigid-body parameters

The bonds between various bases are well defined because of their rigid and planar shape. The spatial interactions between the two bases can be classified in 6 rigid-body parameters or intra-base pair parameters (3 translational, 3 rotational) as shown in Figure 4. These parameters describe the base pairs' three dimensional conformation.

The three translational arrangements are known as shear, stretch, and stagger. These three parameters are directly related to the proximity and direction of the hydrogen bonds. The rotational arrangements are buckle, propeller, and opening. Rotational arrangements relate to the non-planar confirmation (as compared to the ideal coplanar geometry). Intra-base pair parameters are used to determine the structure and stabilities of non-canonical base pairs and were originally created for the base pairings in DNA, but were found to also fit the non-canonical base models.

==== Exhaustive enumeration ====
With all of the various base pair combinations there are 169 theoretically possible base pair combinations. The actual number of base-pair combinations is lower because some combinations result in non-favorable interactions. This number of possible non-canonical base pairs is still being determined as it depends strongly on base pairing criteria. Understanding base pair configuration is similarly difficult since the pairing is depends on the bases surroundings. These surroundings can consist of adjacent base pairs, adjacent loops, or third interactions (such as a base triple).

According to the Leontis-Westhoff scheme, any base pair can be systematically and unambiguously named using the syntax <Base_1: Base_2><Edge_1: Edge_2><Glycosidic Bond Orientation> where Base_1 and Base_2 carry information on respective base identities and their nucleotide number. This nomenclature scheme also allows us to enumerate the total number of distinct possible base pair types. For a given glycosidic bond orientation, say Cis, the four naturally occurring bases each have three possible edges for formation of base pairs giving rise to 12 such possible base pairing edge identities, each of which can in principle form base pairing with any edge of another base, irrespective of complementarity. This gives rise to a 12x12 symmetric matrix displaying 144 pairwise permutations of base pairing edge identities, where, apart from the 12 diagonal entries, others include repeat combinations. Thus, there are 78 (= 12 + 132/2) unique entries corresponding to the cis glycosidic bond orientation. Considering both cis and trans glycosidic bond orientations, the number of base pair types amounts to 156.

Of course, this number 156 is only an indicator. It includes base-edge combinations where base pairs cannot be formed due to absence of hydrogen bond donor acceptor complementarities. For example, potential pairing between two guanine residues utilizing their Watson-Crick edges in cis form (cWW) is not supported by hydrogen bonding donor-acceptor complementarity, and is not observed with consistent hydrogen bonding pattern. This method of enumerating the possible number of distinct base pair types also does not consider possibilities of multimodality or bifurcated base pairs, or even instances of base pairs involving modified bases, protonated bases and water or ion mediation in hydrogen bond formation. Two cytosine bases can form trans Watson-Crick/Watson-Crick (tWW) base pairing with their neutral as well as hemi protonated forms, possibly both, giving rise to the i-motif DNA. However, both C(+):C tWW and C:C tWW, are counted as one type among 156 possible types.

==== Geometric isosteres ====
Although significant differences are there between structures of non-canonical base pairs belonging to different geometric families, some base pairs within the same geometric family have been found to substitute each other without disrupting the overall structure. These base pairs are called isosteric base pairs. Isosteric base pairs always belong to same geometric families, but all the base pairs in a particular geometric family are not always isosteric. Two base pairs are called isosteric if they meet the following three criteria: (i) The C1′–C1′ distances should be similar; (ii) the paired bases should be related by the similar rotation in 3D space; and (iii) H-bonds formation should occur between equivalent base positions. A detailed approach towards quantifying isostericity, in terms of an IsoDiscrepancy Index (IDI), which can facilitate reliable prediction regarding which base pair substitutions can potentially occur in conserved motifs, was formulated by Neocles Leontis, Craig Zirbel and Eric Westhof. Based on IDI values and available base pair structural data, the group maintains a curated online base pair catalogue and an updated set of Isostericity Matrices (IM) corresponding to each of the 12 geometric families. Using this resource, one can comprehensively classify different types of canonical and non-canonical base pairs in terms of their positions in the Isostericity Matrices. This approach, for example, indicates that the four base pair types: A:U cWW, U:A cWW, G:C cWW and C:G cWW are isosteric to each other. Thus, as also confirmed by detailed sequence comparisons, double mutations altering A:U cWW to U:A cWW or even to G:C cWW may not disturb the structure, and, unless stability issues are involved, the function of the related RNA. It was also found that the wobble G:U cWW base pair is not really isosteric to U:G cWW base pair, indicating that such double mutations may significantly affect the functioning of the corresponding RNA. On the other hand, some of the base pairs which are stabilized involving Sugar edge of the bases are mutually isosteric.

== Identification ==
In case of double helical DNA, identification of base pairs is quite trivial using molecular visualizers such as VMD, RasMol, PyMOL etc. It is, however, not so simple for single stranded folded functional RNA molecules. Several algorithms have been implemented in software tools for the automated detection of base pairs in RNA structures solved by X-ray crystallography, NMR or other methods. Essentially the programs detect hydrogen bonds between two bases, and ensure their (near) planar orientation, before reporting that they constitute a base pair. Since most of the structures of RNA, available in public domain, are solved by X-ray crystallography, the positions of hydrogen atoms are rarely reported. Hence, detection of hydrogen bond becomes a non-trivial job.

The DSSR algorithm by Lu and Wilma K. Olson considers two bases to be paired when they detect one or more hydrogen bond(/s) between the bases, by actually modeling the positions of the hydrogen atoms, and by ensuring the perpendiculars to the two bases being nearly parallel to each other. The positions of the hydrogen atoms can be deduced by converting Internal Coordinates (bond length, bond angle and torsion angle) along with positions of precursor atoms, such as amino group nitrogen atoms and those bonded to the nitrogen or Z-matrix to external Cartesian Coordinates. The base pairs identified by this method are listed in NDB and FR3D databases.

A unique way of identification of base pairs in RNA was incorporated in MC-Annotate by Francois Major. In this algorithm they make use of the positions of the hydrogen atoms as well as lone-pair electrons using suitable molecular mechanics/dynamics force-fields and derive hydrogen bond formation probabilities for them. The final identifications of base pairs are done based on these probabilities and approach of hydrogen atoms to lone-pairs electrons of nitrogen or oxygen. This method also attempted to classify the base pair nomenclature with additional information of each interacting edge, such as Ws indicating the sugar edge corner of the Watson-Crick edge, Wh representing the Hoogsteen edge corner of Watson-Crick edge, Bw indicating bifurcated three-center hydrogen bond involving both the hydrogen atoms of amino groups to form hydrogen bonds with a carbonyl oxygen involving both of its lone-pairs, etc. As claimed by the authors, this nomenclature scheme adds some additional features to the Leontis-Westhof (LW) scheme and may be referred to as the LW+ scheme. A major advantage of this scheme lies in its ability to distinguish between alternative base pairing geometries, where multimodality is observed within an LW family. This method, however, does not consider the possible participation of the 2'-OH group of the ribose sugars in base pair formation.

Another algorithm, namely BPFIND by Dhananjay Bhattacharyya and coworkers, demands at least two hydrogen bonds using two distinct sets of donors and acceptors atoms between the bases. This hypothesis driven algorithm considers distances between two pairs of atoms (hydrogen bond donor (D1 and D2) and acceptor (A1 and A2) and four suitably chosen precursor atoms (PD1, PD2, PA1, PA2) corresponding to the D's and A's. Small values of such distances in conjunction with large values of the angles defined by θ_{1}(PD1—D1—A1), θ_{2}(D1—A1—PA1), θ_{3}(PD2—D2—A2), θ_{4}(D2—A2—PA2) (close to 180^{o} or π^{c}) ensures two structural features which characterize well defined base pairs: i) the hydrogen bonds are strong and linear and ii) the two bases are co-planar. Notably, so long as one restricts the search to base pairs which are stabilized by at least two distinct hydrogen bonds, the above algorithms, by and large, yield the same set of base pairs in different RNA structures.

Sometimes in the crystal structures it is observed that two closely spaced bases are oriented in such a way that apart from the regular hydrogen bonds two additional electronegative hydrogen bond acceptor atoms are very close to each other, which may cause electrostatic repulsion. The concept of protonated base pairing, implicating a possible protonation of one of these electronegative, (potentially) hydrogen bond acceptor atoms thus converting it into a hydrogen bond donor, was introduced to explain stability of such geometries. Some of the NMR derived structures also support the protonation hypothesis, but possibly more rigorous studies using neutron diffraction or other techniques would be able to confirm it. The quality of the crystal structures permitting, some algorithms also attempted to detect water or cation mediated base pair formation.

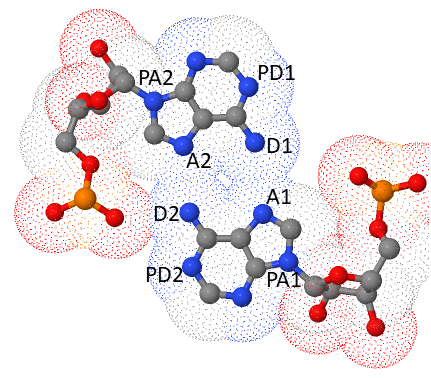
Descriptions of the hydrogen bonding atoms, along with their precursors, for a typical non-canonical base pair (as used by BPFIND)

== Stability ==
The canonical Watson-Crick base pairs, G:C and A:T/U as well as most of the non-canonical ones are stabilized by two or more (e.g. 3 in the case of G:C cWW) hydrogen bonds. Justifiably, a significant amount of research on non-canonical base pairs has been carried out towards bench-marking their strengths (interaction energies) and (geometric) stability against those of the canonical base pairs. It may be noted here that base pair geometries, as observed in the crystal structures, are often influenced by several interactions present in the crystal environment, thus perturbing their intrinsically stable geometries arising out of the hydrogen bonding and related interactions between the two bases. Therefore, in principle, it is possible that the observed geometries in some cases are intrinsically unstable, and that they are stabilized by other interactions provided by the environment. Several groups have attempted to determine the interaction energies in these non-canonical base pairs using different quantum chemistry based approaches, such as Density functional theory (DFT) or MP2 methods. These methods were applied on suitably truncated, hydrogen-added, and geometry optimized models of the base (or nucleoside) pairs extracted from PDB structures. Depending upon the optimization protocol, typically three types of interaction energies have been reported. In the first method, the base pair model geometries, isolated from their respective environments, are fully optimized without any constraints. thus providing the intrinsic geometries and interaction energies of the isolated models. This procedure, however, sometimes leads to optimized geometries of base pairs involving edges different from initial crystal geometry. Abhijit Mitra and collaborators also used an additional second protocol, where the heavy atom (non-hydrogen) coordinates are retained as in the crystal geometries, optimizing only the positions of the added hydrogen atoms. In the third protocol, followed mostly by Jiri Sponer and his group, optimization was carried out with constraints on some angles and dihedrals. Given that the models are extracted from their respective crystal structures, and are isolated from their crystal environments, the second and the third protocols provide two different approaches towards approximating the environmental effects, without explicit considerations of any specific environmental interactions. This has further been addressed in some reports by considering specific environmental factors, such as coordination with Magnesium, or even some covalent modifications to the bases.

All the three protocols are useful in their respective contexts. Further, a comparison of the model geometries, obtained by the different protocols, provide an idea regarding both, the stability of the corresponding base pair geometries, as well as regarding the probable extent and nature of environmental influences. It was found that most non-canonical base pairs, having two or more hydrogen bonds, generally maintain the same hydrogen bonding pattern in the crystal and in fully optimized in isolation geometries, respectively, thus indicating their intrinsic geometric stability. Interaction energies calculated from these optimized models also indicated the energetic stability of the corresponding non-canonical base pairs. The previous notion that non-canonical base pairs are weaker than the Watson-Crick base pairs, was found to be incorrect. Interaction energies between the bases of Several base pairs, such as G:G tWW, G:G cWH, A:U cHW, G:A cWW, G:U cWW, etc., are found to be larger than that of canonical A:U cWW base pair.

Of course all non-canonical base pairs are not necessarily very strong or stable in terms of interaction energy. Several base pairs have been detected on the basis of weak hydrogen bonds involving C—H...O/N atoms, where interaction energies are rather small. Further, geometry optimizations of some of the observed base pairs, in particular, but not limited to those involving weak hydrogen bonds, or those stabilized by single hydrogen bonds, were found to adopt alternate geometries, thus indicating their intrinsic lack of geometric stability. These alteration of hydrogen bonding schemes, giving rise to changes in base pairing family upon free optimization, may have some functional implication in RNA, such as their action as conformational switch. Accordingly, as mentioned above in the Sponer's protocol, there have been some attempts to restrain the experimentally observed geometry while carrying out geometry optimization for interaction energy calculations. Interestingly, in several cases, interaction energies calculated for these 'away from intrinsically stable' geometries also indicate good energetic stability.

Though the energetics and geometric stabilities of different non-canonical base pairs do not show any generalized correlations, analysis of several databases, such as RNABPDB and RNABP COGEST, which catalogue structural and energetic features of some of the observed base pair and their stacks, reveal some interesting general trends.

For example, geometry optimizations of several base pairs involving 2'-OH group of sugar residue resulted in significant alterations from their initial geometry. This is possibly due to flexibility of the sugar puckers and glycosidic torsions. The significantly high interaction energies of protonated base pairs, despite the high energy cost of base protonation, also deserve a special mention in this context. This can mostly be attributed to the additional charge-induced dipole interactions which are associated with protonated base pairs.

== Higher-order structure ==
The secondary and three-dimensional structures of RNA are formed and stabilized through non-canonical base pairs. Base pairs make up many secondary structural blocks which aid the folding of RNA complexes and three dimensional structures. The overall folded RNA is stabilized by the tertiary and secondary structures canonically base pairing together. Due to the many possible non-canonical base pairs, there are an unlimited amount of structures, which allows for the diverse functions of RNA. The arrangement of the non-canonical bases also allow long-range RNA interactions, recognition of proteins and other molecules, and structural stabilizing elements. Many of the common non-canonical base pairs can be added to a stacked RNA stem without disturbing its helical character.

=== Secondary structure ===
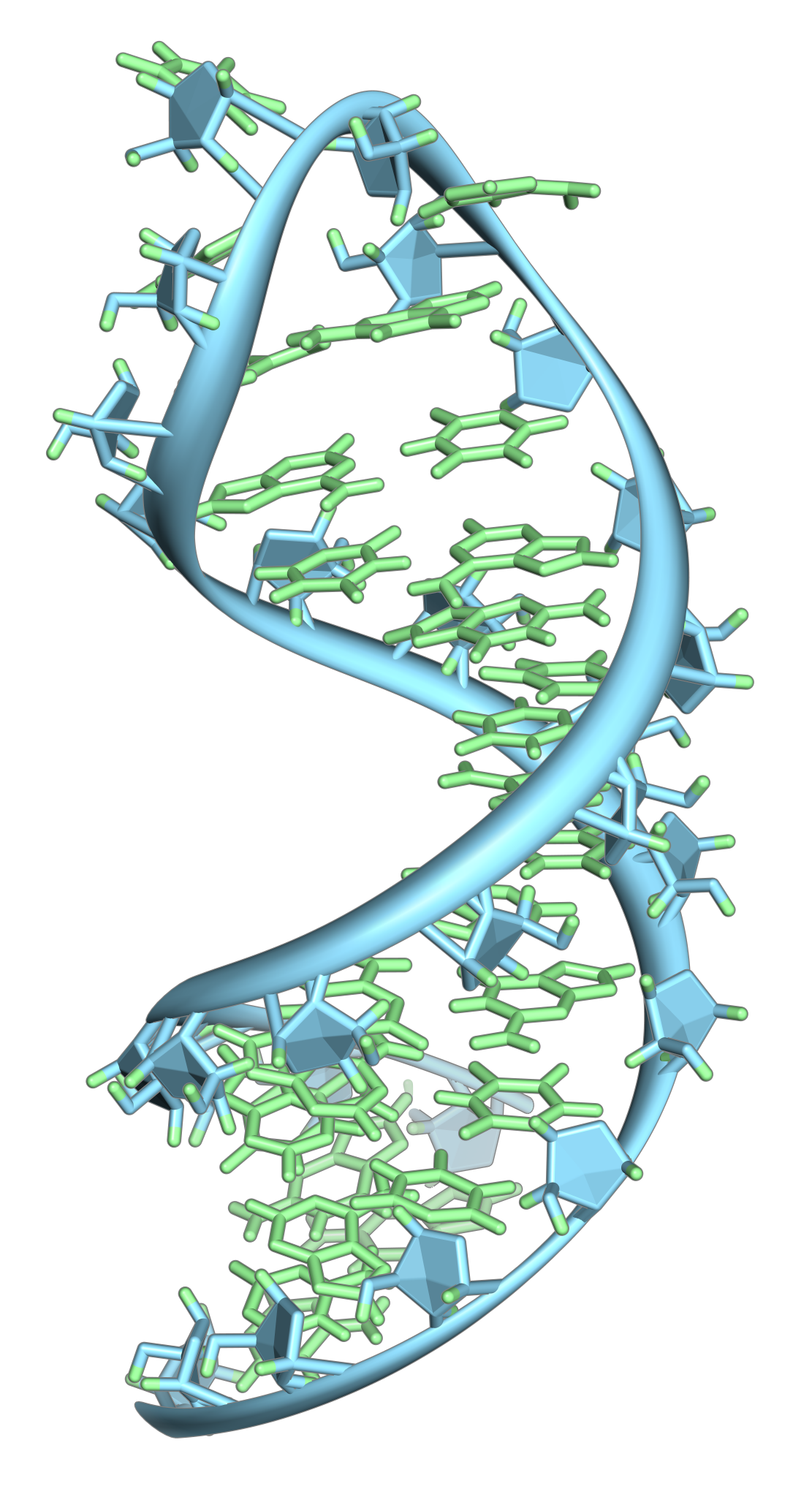
Figure 7: This depicts a hairpin structure found in pre m-RNA

Basic secondary structural elements of RNA include bulges, double helices, hairpin loops, and internal loops. An example of a hairpin loop of RNA is given in Figure 7. As shown in the figure, hairpin loops and internal loops require a sudden change in backbone direction. Non-canonical base pairing allows for the increased flexibility at junctions or turns required in the secondary structure.

=== Tertiary structure ===
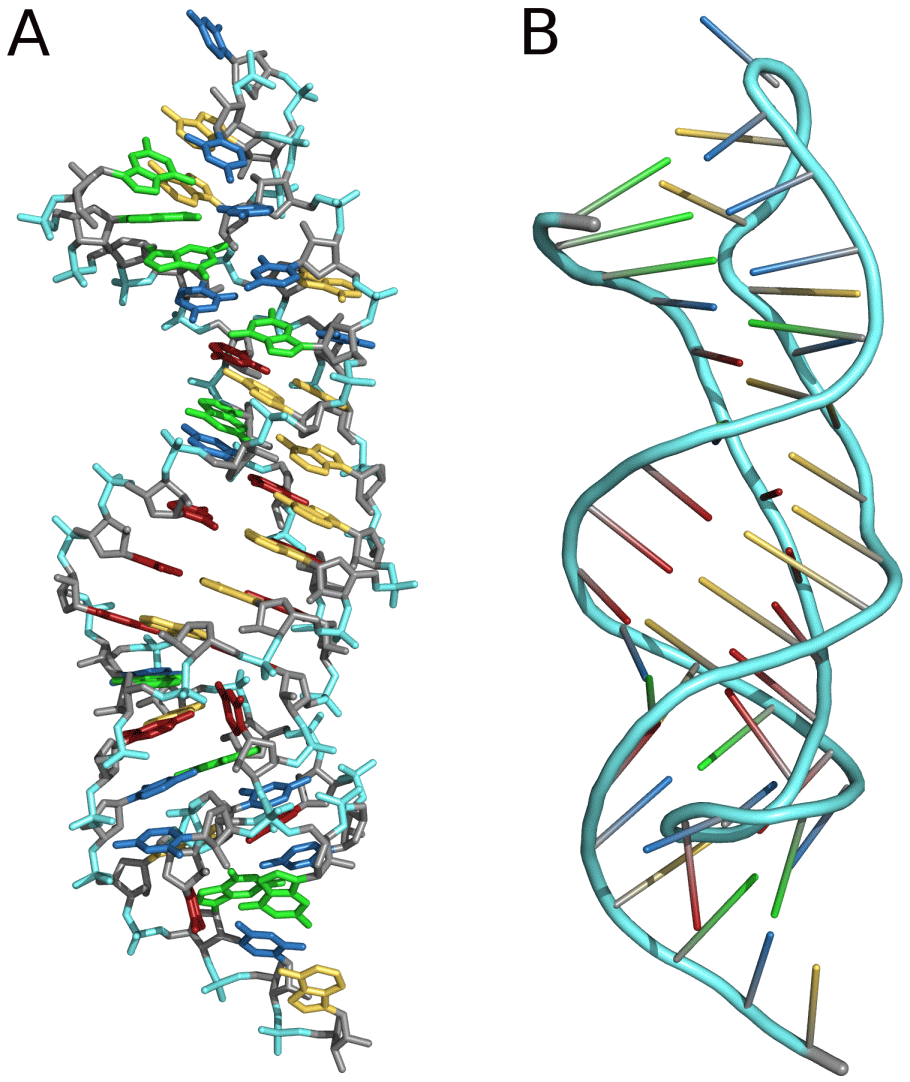
Figure 8: An example of a Pseudoknot three-dimensional structure.

Three-dimensional structures are formed through the long-range intra-molecular interactions between the secondary structures. This leads to the formation of pseudoknots, ribose zippers, kissing hairpin loops, or co-axial pseudocontinuous helices. The three-dimensional structures of RNA are primarily determined through molecular simulations or computationally guided measurements. An example of a Pseudoknot is given in Figure 8.

Structural features of a base-pair, formed by two planar rigid units, can be quantified, using six parameters – three translational and three rotational. IUPAC recommended parameters are Propeller, Buckle, Open Angle, Stagger, Shear and Stretch (Figure 8). There are several publicly available software, such as Curves by Richard Lavery, 3DNA by Olson, NUPARM by Manju Bansal, etc., which may be used to calculate these parameters. While the first two calculate the parameters of canonical and non-canonical base-pairs relative to the standard canonical Watson-Crick base pairs geometry, the NUPARM algorithm calculates in absolute terms using base pairing edge specific axis system. Hence, for most non-canonical base-pairs, which involve non-Watson-Crick edges, some of the parameters (Open, Shear and Stretch) calculated by Curves or 3DNA are usually large even in their respective intrinsically most stable geometries. On the other hand, the values provided by NUPARM indicate the quality of hydrogen bonding and planarity of the two bases in a more realistic fashion. Thus, the NUPARM Stretch values, indicating separation of the two bases of a base pair, and which depend on optimal hydrogen bonding distances, are always around 3Ǻ. Some other general trends observed in the values of the above parameters may be of interest to note. Most of the cis base pairs are seen to have Propeller values around -10^{o} and small values of Buckle and Stagger. The Open and Shear values often depend on positions of the hydrogen bonding atoms. As for example, GU cWW wobble base pairs have Shear value around -2.2Ǻ while GC or AU cWW base pairs have Shear values around zero. The Open values for most base pairs are close to zero but the values are often rather large for those involving 2'-OH group of sugar in the NUPARM derived parameter set. The trans base pairs, however, do not show any systematic trend in their Propeller values.

==== In RNA ====
The structural hierarchy in RNA is usually described in terms of a stem-loop 2D secondary structure, which further folds to form its 3D tertiary structure, stabilized by what are referred to as long range tertiary contacts. Most often the non-canonical base pairs are involved in those tertiary contacts or extra-stem base pairs. For example, some of the non-canonical base pairs in tRNA appear between the D-stem and TψC loops (Figure 5), which are close in the three-dimensional structure. Such base pairing interactions give stability to the L-shaped structure of tRNA. In this region, some base pairs are found to be additionally hydrogen bonded to a third base. Thus, the 23rd residue is simultaneously paired to 9th and 12th residues, together forming a base triple, the smallest member of the class of higher order multiplets.

==== Multiplets ====
One base, in addition to forming proper planar base pairing with a second base, can often participate in base pair formation with a third base forming a base triple. One such classic example is in formation of DNA triple helix, where two bases of two antiparallel strands form consecutive Watson-Crick base pairs in a double helix and a base of a third strand form Hoogsteen base pairing with the purine bases of the Watson-Crick base pairs. Many different types of base triples have been reported in the available RNA structures and have been elegantly classified in the literature. Multiplets are however not limited to triplet formation. Four bases giving rise to a base quartet is now well documented in the structure of the G-quadruplex characteristically found in the telomere. Here four Guanine residues pair up within themselves in a cyclic form involving Watson-Crick/Hoogsteen cis (cWH) base pairing scheme and each of the Guanine bases are found to be respectively interact with two other guanine bases. Three to four such base G-quadruplexes stack on top of the other to form a four stranded DNA structure. In addition to such a cyclic topology, several other topologies of base:base pairings are possible for higher order multiplets such as quartets, pentets etc.

==== Double helical regions ====
Non-canonical base pairs quite frequently appear within double helical regions of RNA. The G:U cWW non-canonical base pairs are seen very frequently within double helical regions as this base pair is nearly isosteric to the other canonical ones. Due to complication of strand direction, as elaborated in the Classification section (Table 1), not all types of non-canonical base pairs can be accommodated within double helical regions with anti glycosidic torsion angles. However, many non-canonical base pairs, e.g. A:G tHS (trans Hoogsteen/Sugar edge) or A:U tHW (trans Hoogsteen/Watson-Crick), A:G cWW, etc., are often seen within double helical regions giving rise to symmetric internal loop like motifs. Attempts have been made to classify all such situations where two base pairs (canonical or non-canonical) stack in anti-parallel sense possibly giving rise to double helical regions in RNA structures. These base pairs are quite stable, and they are able to maintain the helical property quite well. The backbone torsion angles around these residues are also generally within reasonable limits: C3'-endo sugar pucker with anti glycosidic torsion, α/γ torsion angles around -60^{o}/60^{o}, β/ε torsion angles around 180^{o}.

==== Recurrent structural motifs ====
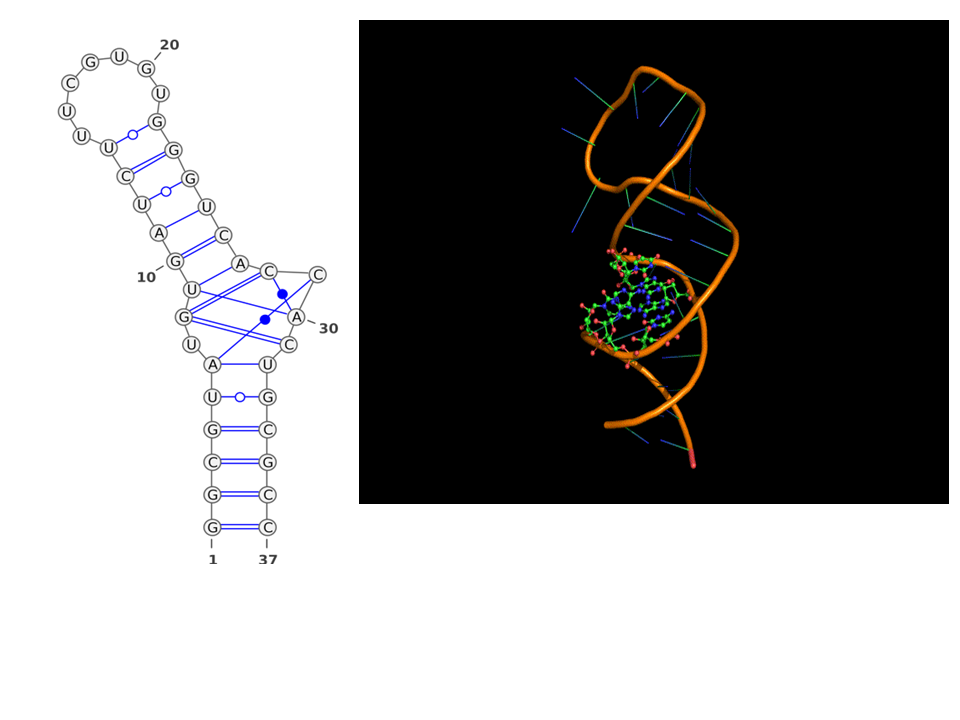
An example of higher order structure (C-loop) in RNA by formation of base triples using non-canonical base pair from PDB: 1KOG (a) by schematic representation and (b) by molecular visualizer.

Non-canonical base pairs often appear in different structural motifs, including pseudoknots, with their special hydrogen bonding features. Structural features of these recurrent motifs have been archived in searchable databases, such as, FR3D and RNA FRABASE. Also, several of these motifs can be identified in a given query PDB file by the NASSAM web-server. They are most frequently detected at the termini of double helical segment acting as capping residues, often preceding hairpin loops. The most frequently found non-canonical base pair, namely G:A tSH, is an integral part of GNRA tetraloops, where N can be any nucleotide residue and R is a purine residue. This motif shows some amount of flexibility and alterations of structural features depending on whether the Guanine and Adenine are paired or not. Several other types of tetraloops motifs, such as UNCG, YNMG, GNAC, CUYG, (where Y stands for pyrimidine and M is either Adenine or Cytosine) etc., have been found in available RNA structures. However, these do not generally show involvement of non-canonical base pairing. In addition to these common hairpin motifs, where the loop residues largely remain unpaired, there are also a few motifs where the loop residues make extensive interactions between themselves or with other residues external to the loop. A common example is the C-loop motif, where the bulging loop residues make non-canonical base pairing with the bases of double helical regions forming non-canonical base pairing (Figure 9). The extra base pairs in these cases give rise to additional stabilization to the composite double helix containing motif. Non-canonical base pairs are also involved in receptor-loop interaction, such as in T-loop motif. Another interesting example of the involvement of non-canonical base pairs in recurrent contexts was detected as the GAAA receptor motif, which consists of A:A cHS base pair followed by U:A tWH base pair stacked on both sides by G:C cWW base pairs. Here we have successive non-canonical base pairs within an antiparallel RNA double helical domain. Similarly there is an A:A cSH base pair involving two consecutive residues in this motif. Such pairing between consecutive residues, which is also termed as a dinucleotide platform motif, is quite commonly observed. They appear in many RNA structures and the pairing can also be between other bases. Such dinucleotide platform was reported in A:A, A:G, A:U, G:A, G:U base pairs belonging to the cSH class and also in A:A cHH base pairs. These motifs can alter the strand direction within a double helix by formation of kinks. Such dinucleotide platform along with triplet formation is also an integral component of the Sarcin-ricin motif.

== Modeling ==
Prediction of biomolecular structure from sequence alone is a long-term goal of scientists working in the fields of bioinformatics, computational chemistry, statistical physics as well as in computer science. Prediction of protein structures from amino acid sequence by methods like homology modeling, comparative modeling, threading, etc. were largely successful due to availability of about 1200 unique protein folds. Inspired by the protein experience, there are now several approaches towards predicting RNA structures, albeit with varying degrees of success.

It can be seen that most of the approaches are essentially limited to the prediction of stems and loops in 2D, also referred to as RNA secondary structure. For example, minimum computed free energy prediction of double helical regions of RNA sequences from the energy of base pairing and stacking interactions, essentially computationally derived from experimental thermodynamic data, was initially introduced by Ruth Nussinov and later by Michael Zuker. This, in turn, has inspired several related modified algorithms, including data on neighboring group interactions etc. Most of these approaches, however, mainly consider data on canonical base pairing, with only a few which also consider thermodynamic data on Hoogsteen base pairs. Thus, in addition to the computational costs and complications associated with the identification of pseudoknots, all these methods also suffer from the drawback associated with the paucity of experimental data on non-canonical base pairs.

However, there are also several approaches which attempt at predicting the tertiary 3D structure corresponding to given predicted 2D structures. There are also a few involving 3D fragment based modeling, which are getting further facilitated with the increasing availability of motif wise curated RNA 3D structure data. It is also encouraging to note that there are now some software and servers, such as MC-Fold, RNAPDBee, RNAWolfe, etc. available for exploring non-canonical base pairing in RNA 3D structures. Some of these methods depend on structural database of RNA, such as FRABASE, to obtain 3D coordinates of motifs containing non-canonical base pairs and stitch the information with 3D structure of double helices containing canonical base pairs.

It may be relevant in this context, to mention about the approach towards 3D model building of double helical regions with both canonical and non-canonical base pairs used in 3DNA by Olson or in RNAHelix by Bhattacharyya and Bansal. These software suites use base pair parameters to generate 3D coordinates of individual dinucleotide steps, which can be extended to model double helices of arbitrary lengths with canonical or non-canonical base pairs.

The above-mentioned methods attempt to model a single structure (2D or 3D) of a given RNA sequence. However, growing evidences indicate that a given RNA sequence can adopt ensemble of structures and possibly interconvert between them. This ensembles obviously adopt different base pairing patterns between different sets of residues. Thus, there are enough pointers to suggest that the focus on modeling single structures appears to have been a bottleneck for accurate modeling of RNA structure.

The theoretical prediction of RNA 2D structure and consequently 3D structure can also be confirmed by different chemical probing methods. One of the latest such tools is SHAPE (Selective 2′-hydroxyl acylation analyzed by primer extension), and SHAPE-Directed RNA Secondary Structure Prediction appears to be most promising. Coupled with mutational profiling, ensembles of RNA structures, which often include non-canonical base pairing, can be experimentally studied using the SHAPE-MaP approach. One of the ways ahead today appears to be an integration of Zuker's minimum free energy approach with experimentally derived SHAPE data, including simulated SHAPE data as outlined in Montaseri et al. (2016) and Spasic et al. (2017).

== History ==
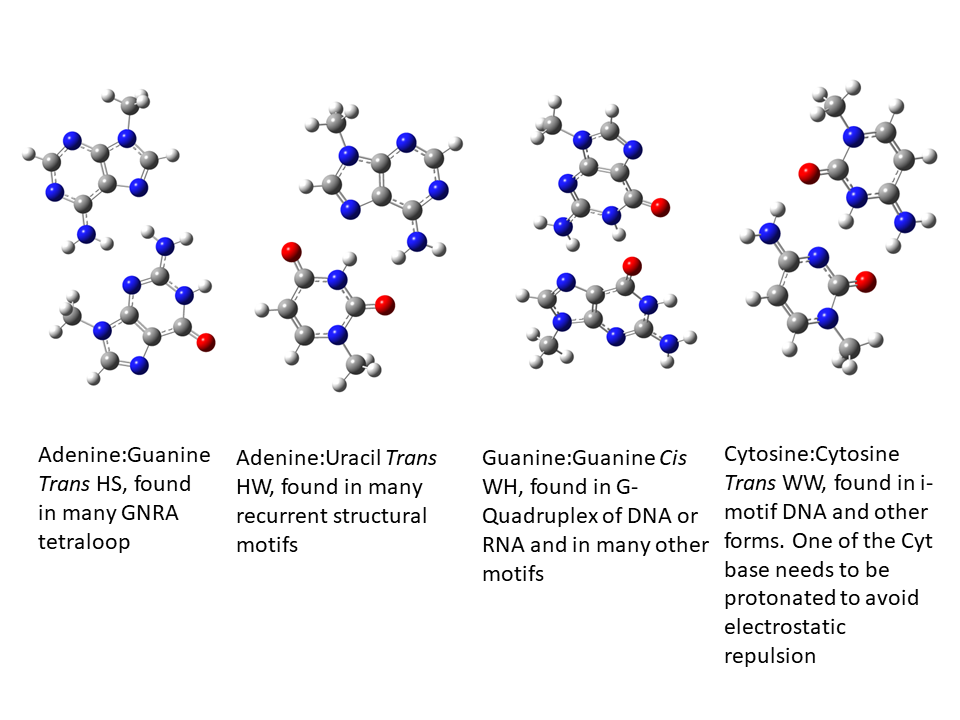
Examples of few frequently observed non-canonical base pairs, (a) adenine:guanine trans Hoogsteen/Sugar-edge, (b) adenine:uracil trans Hoogsteen/Watson-Crick, (c) guanine:guanine cis Watson-Crick/Hoogsteen; (d)Protonated cytosine(+):cytosine trans Watson-Crick/Watson-Crick.

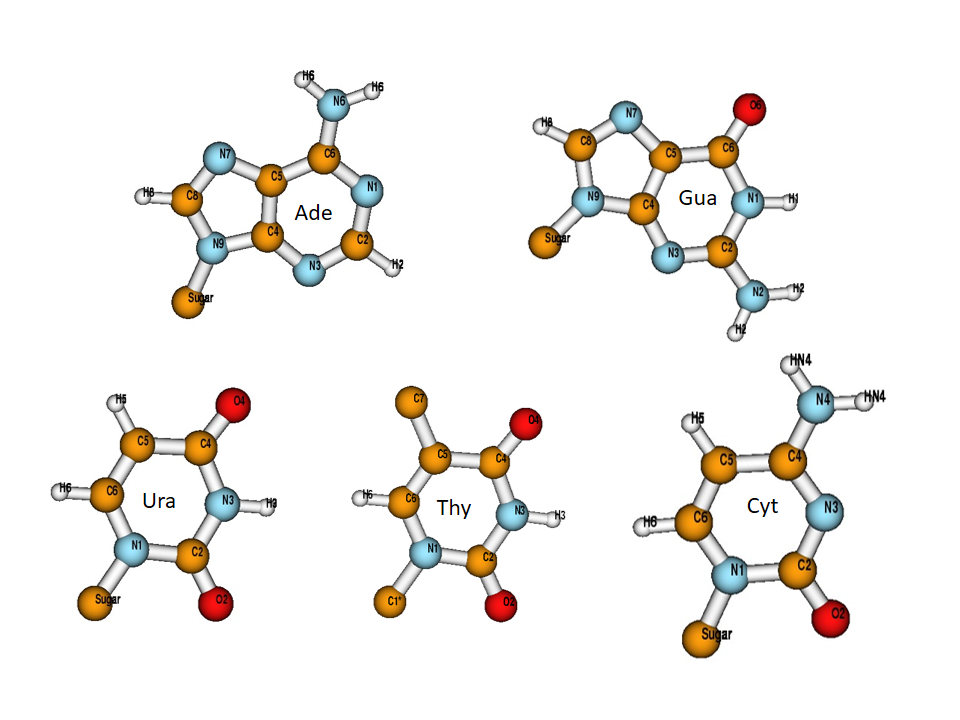
IUPAC-IUB recommended nomenclature of nucleotide base atoms of adenine, guanine, uracil and cytosine bases (created in MOLDEN).

Double helical structures of DNA as well as folded single stranded RNA are now known to be stabilized by Watson-Crick base pairing between the purines, adenine and guanine, with the pyrimidines, thymine (or uracil for RNA) and cytosine. In this scheme, the N1 atoms of the purine residues respectively form hydrogen bond with the N3 atoms of the pyrimidine residues in A:T and G:C complementarity. The second hydrogen bond in A:T base pairs involves the N6 amino group of adenine and the O4 atom of thymine (or uracil in RNA). Similarly, the second hydrogen bond in G:C base pairs involves O6 atom and N4 amino group of guanine and cytosine, respectively. The G:C base pairs also have a third hydrogen bond involving the N2 amino group of guanine and the O2 atom of cytosine. However, even until about twenty years after this scheme was initially proposed by James D. Watson and Francis H.C. Crick, experimental evidences suggesting other forms of base-base interactions continued to draw the attention of researchers investigating the structure of DNA. The first high resolution structure of an adenine:thymine base pair, as solved by Karst Hoogsteen by single crystal X-ray crystallography in 1959 revealed a structure whose geometry was very different from what was proposed by Watson and Crick. It had two hydrogen bonds involving N7 and N6 atoms of adenine and N3 and O4 (or O2) atoms of thymine. It may be noted that due to use of thymine base with methyl group representing sugar, a symmetry axis appears passing through N1 and C6 atoms and the O2 and O4 atoms appears identical. In order to distinguish this alternate base pairing scheme from the Watson-Crick scheme, base pairs where a hydrogen bond involves the N7 atom of a purine residue have been referred to as Hoogsteen base pair, and later, the purine base edge which includes its N7 atom is referred to as its Hoogsteen edge. The first high resolution structure of guanine:cytosine pair, obtained by W. Guschelbauer also was similar to the Hoogsteen base pair, although this structure required an unusual protonation of N1 imino nitrogen of cytosine, which is possible only at significantly lower pH. Experimental evidences, including low resolution NMR studies as well as high resolution X-ray crystallographic studies, supporting Watson-Crick base pairing were obtained as late as in the early '70s. Almost a decade later, with the advent of efficient DNA synthesis methods, Richard Dickerson followed by several other groups, solved structures of the physiological double helical B-DNA with a complete helical turn, based on the crystals of synthetic DNA oligomers. The pairing geometries of the A:T (A:U in RNA) and G:C pairs in these structures confirmed the common or canonical form of base pairing as proposed by Watson and Crick, while those with all other geometries, and compositions, are now referred to as non-canonical base pairs.

It was noticed that even in double stranded DNA, where canonical Watson Crick base pairs associate the two complementary anti-parallel strands together, there were occasional occurrences of Hoogsteen and other non-Watson-Crick base pairs. It was also proposed that within Watson-Crick base pair dominated DNA double helices, Hoogsteen base pair formation could be a transient phenomenon.

While canonical Watson-Crick base pairs are most prevalent and are commonly observed in a majority of chromosomal DNA and in most functional RNAs, presence of stable non-canonical base pairs is also extremely significant in DNA biology. An example of non-Watson-Crick, or non-canonical, base pairing can be found at the ends of chromosomal DNA. The 3'-ends of chromosomes contain single stranded overhangs with some conserved sequence motifs (such as TTAGGG in most vertebrates). The single stranded region adopts some definite three-dimensional structures, which has been solved by X-ray crystallography as well as by NMR spectroscopy. The single strands containing the above sequence motifs are found to form interesting four stranded mini-helical structures stabilized by Hoogsteen base pairing between guanine residues. In these structures, four guanine residues form a near planar base quartet, referred to as G-quadruplex, where each guanine participates in base pairing with its neighboring guanine, involving their Watson-Crick and Hoogsteen edges in a cyclic manner. The four central carbonyl groups are often stabilized by potassium ions (K^{+}). From the full genomic sequences of different organisms, it has been observed that telomere like sequences sometimes also interrupt double helical regions near transcription start site of some oncogenes, such as c-myc. It is possible that these sequence stretches form G-quadruplex like structures, which can suppress the expression of the related genes. The complementary cytosine rich sequences, on the other strand, may adopt another similar four stranded structure, the i-motif, stabilized by cytosine:cytosine non-canonical base pairs.

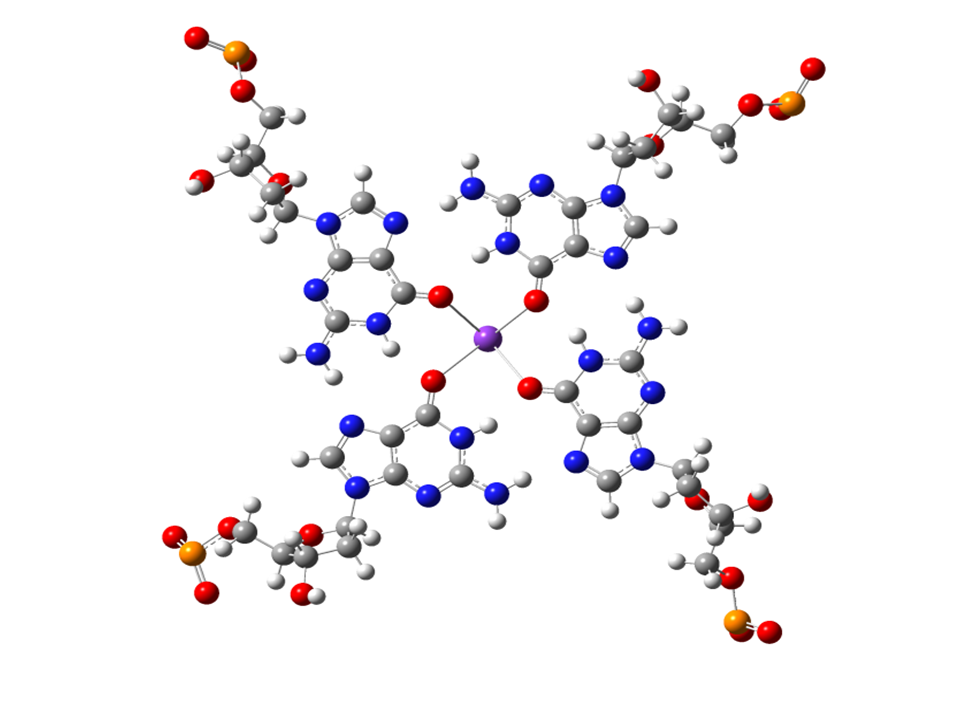
Structure of a representative G-Quadruplex consisting of Hoogsteen base pairs between every neighboring guanine residues (PDB: 1KF1).

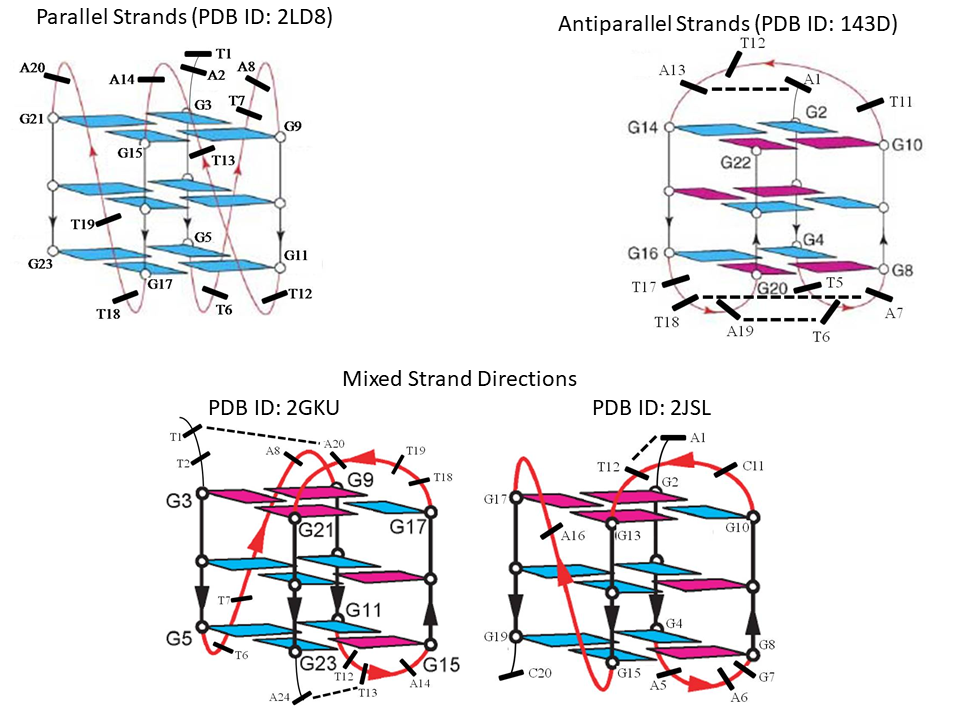
Three G-quadruplexes stack to form four stranded telomere with different topologies for d(GGGATTGGGATTGGGATTGGG) sequence.

While non-canonical base pairs are still relatively rare in DNA, in RNA molecules, where generally a single polymeric strand folds onto itself to form various secondary and tertiary structures, the occurrence of non-Watson-Crick base pairs turns out to be far more prevalent. As early as in the 1970s, analysis of the crystal structure of yeast tRNA^{Phe} showed that RNA structures possess significant non-canonical variations in base pairing schemes. Subsequently, the structures of ribozymes, ribosome, riboswitches, etc. have highlighted their abundance, and hence the need for a comprehensive characterization of Non-Canonical Base Pairs. These three-dimensional RNA structures generally possess several secondary structural motifs, such as double helical stems, stems with hairpin loops, symmetric and asymmetric internal loops, kissing loops between two hairpin motifs, pseudoknots, continuous stacks between two segments of helices, multi helix junctions etc. along with single stranded regions. These secondary structural motifs, except for the single stranded motifs, are stabilized by hydrogen bonded base pairs and several of these are non-canonical base pairs, including G:U Wobble base pairs.

It is notable in this context, that the Wobble hypothesis of Francis Crick predicted the possibility of G:U base pair, in place of the canonical G:C or A:U base pairs, also mediating the recognition between mRNA codons and tRNA anticodons, during protein synthesis. The G:U wobble base pair is the most numerously observed non-canonical base pair. While, because of its geometric similarity with the canonical base pairs, they frequently occur in the double helical stem regions of RNA structures, the geometric differences continue to draw the attention of nucleic acid researchers, providing new insights related to its structural significance. It may be noted that though the base pairs in the folded RNA structures, give rise to double helical stems, its two cleft regions – the major groove and minor groove, differ in their respective dimensions from those in DNA double helices. Unlike for those in DNA, the sequence discriminating major grooves in RNA double helices are very narrow and deep. On the other hand, the minor groove regions, though wide and shallow, do not carry much sequence specific information in terms of the hydrogen bonding donor-acceptor positioning of the corresponding base pair edges. The G:U wobble base pairs, along with the various other non-canonical base pairs, introduce variations in the structures of RNA double helices, thus enhancing the accessibility of the discriminating major groove edges of associated base pairs. This has been seen to be very important for molecular recognition steps during tRNA aminoacylation as well as in ribosome functions.

Considering the immense importance of the non-canonical base pairs in RNA structure, folding and functions, researchers from multiple domains – biology, chemistry, physics, mathematics, computer science, etc., have joined in the effort to understand their structure, dynamics, function and their consequences. The complexities associated with experimental handling of RNA further underline the importance of diverse theoretical inputs towards addressing these issues.

== See also ==
- Hoogsteen base pair
- Wobble base pair
