= Polypurine reverse-Hoogsteen hairpin =

Non-modified oligonucleotides (DNA molecules)

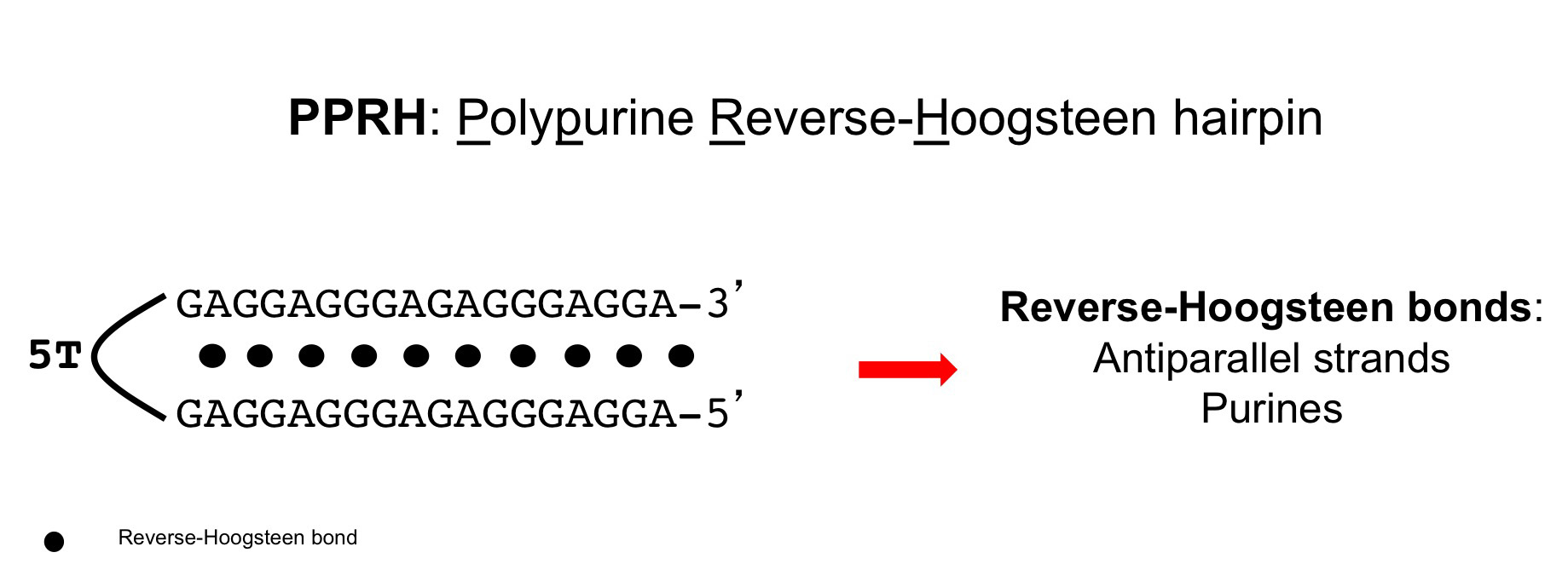
PPRH structure showing the two homopurine domains bound by Reverse Hoogsteen bonds

Polypurine reverse-Hoogsteen hairpins (PPRHs) are non-modified oligonucleotides containing two polypurine domains, in a mirror repeat fashion, linked by a pentathymidine stretch forming double-stranded DNA stem-loop molecules. The two polypurine domains interact by intramolecular reverse-Hoogsteen bonds allowing the formation of this specific hairpin structure.

== Properties ==
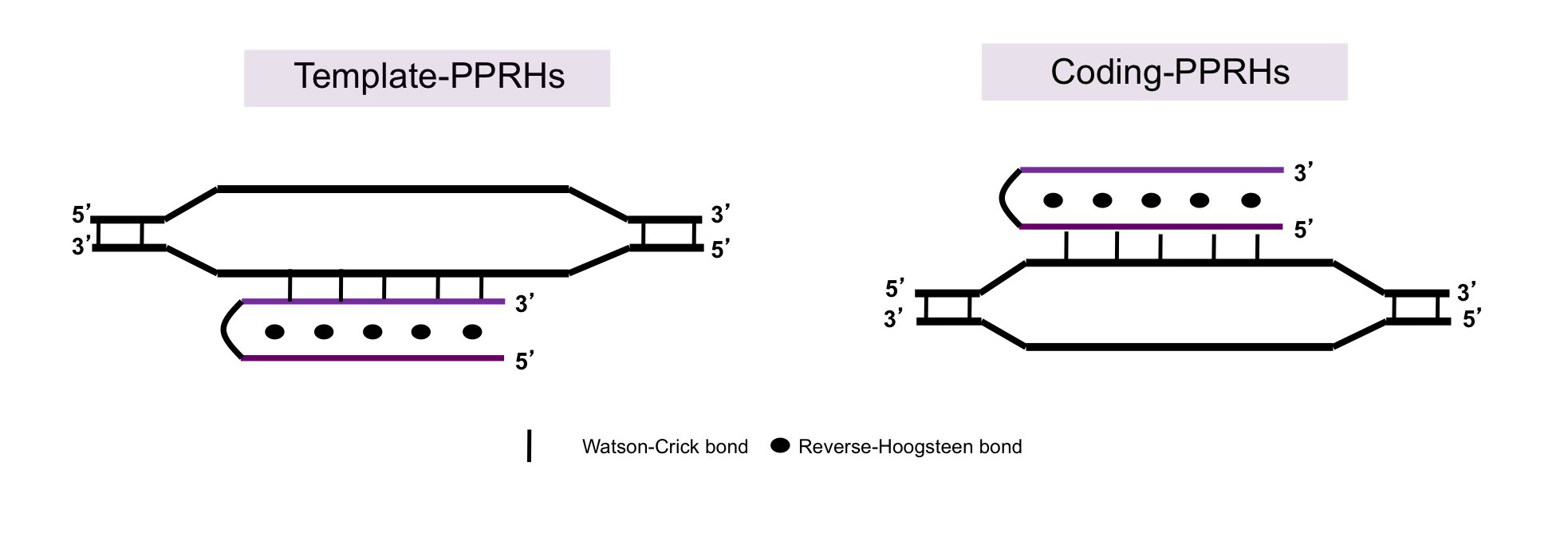
Template-PPRHs bind to the template strand of the dsDNA. Coding-PPRHs bind to the coding strand of the dsDNA

PPRHs can bind to polypyrimidine stretches in either single- or double stranded DNA by Watson and Crick bonds establishing triple-stranded DNA structures. The formation of PPRHs triplexes takes place at physiological pH. PPRHs provoke a strand displacement. of the homopurine sequence of the target dsDNA, opening the two strands of the DNA. There are two types of PPRHs: i) Template-PPRHs that bind to the template strand of DNA, inhibiting transcription; and ii) Coding-PPRHs that bind to the coding strand of the DNA altering splicing. Both types of PPRHs decrease gene expression. PPRHs present high stability in serum and cells and show lack of immunogenicity not activating the innate inflammatory response. PPRHs do not have off-target effects and do not show hepatotoxicity or nephrotoxicity.

== Applications ==
PPRHs could be used as gene silencing tools acting by different mechanisms than triplex forming oligonucleotides (TFOs), antisense oligonucleotides or siRNAs. Upon binding to their targets, PPRHs can decrease the mRNA and protein levels of the selected genes. Their action has been demonstrated in vitro for a number of genes involved in metabolism (DHFR), proliferation (mTOR), DNA topology (TOP1), lifespan and senescence (telomerase), apoptosis (survivin, BCL2), transcription factors and non-druggable targets (c-MYC and k-Ras), proto-oncogenes (MDM2), replication stress (WEE1, CHK1) and Thymidilate synthase (TYMS) as part of a cancer gene therapy strategy. Their preclinical proof of principle has been proven in vivo using the antiapoptotic survivin gene. PPRHs have also been applied as tools in cancer immunotherapy by silencing CD47 in MCF7 breast cancer cells and SIRPα in macrophages, and the PD-1/PD-L1 pathway in human tumor cells. PPRHs can also be used as the capture probe in different devises to detect viral infection by forming a triplex with the RNA of the virus such as SARS-CoV-2 in a technology termed Triplex Enhanced Nucleic Acid Detection Assay (TENADA)

== Design and improvements ==
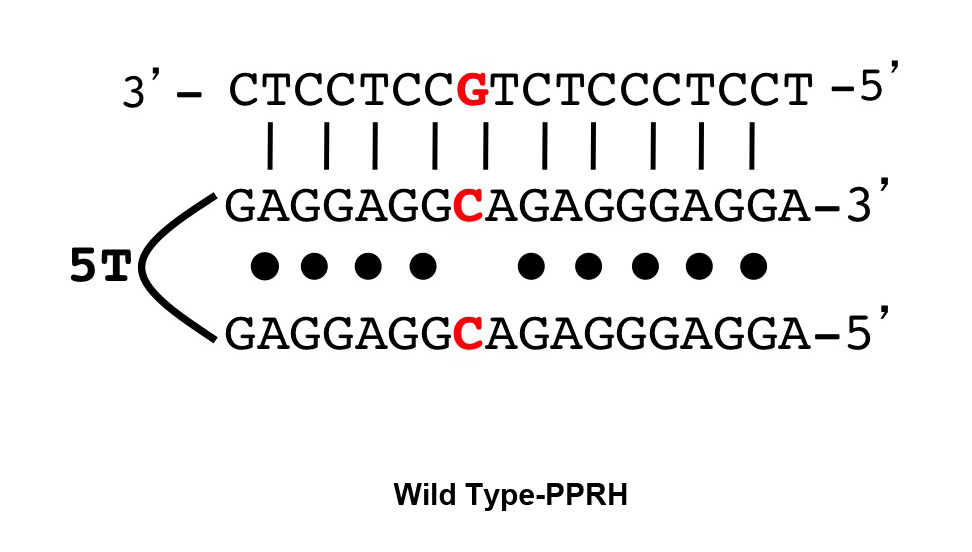
Wild type-PPRH: Version of PPRH containing a pyrimidine in front of purine interruptions in the DNA target.

PPRHs can be designed for virtually any gene in the genome by searching for polypirimidine stretches in the sequence of the desired gene. Optimal lengths for each domain of the PPRHs are within 20–30 nucleotides. The total length of a typical PPRH is 55 nucleotides considering two domains of 25 bases plus 5T for the linking loop. If purine interruptions are encountered (up to three) within the polypirimidine target, the highest affinity of PPRH binding is achieved by placing in the hairpin the complementary base (a pyrimidine) in front of the purines (Wild type-PPRH).

== Wedge-PPRH ==
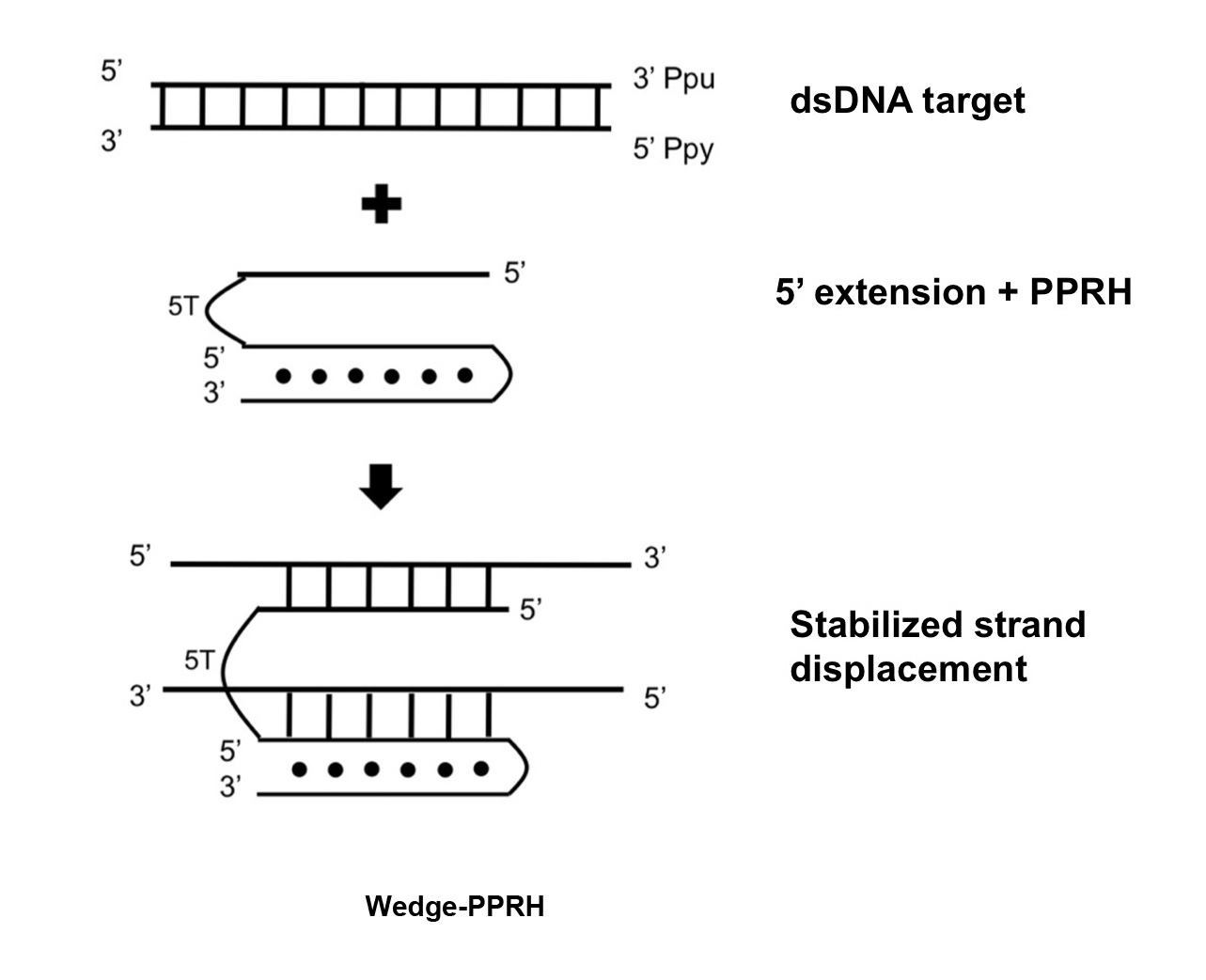
Wedge-PPRH: Specific type of PPRH with an extension on the 5' end bearing the complementary sequence of the displaced strand of the target dsDNA

A further development consists in extending the 5' flank of the PPRH with a sequence complementary to the displaced polypurine strand of the target dsDNA which stabilizes the strand displacement, producing additional binding and functionality.

== WEB tools ==
A triplex target DNA site (TTS), a stretch of DNA that is composed of polypurines, is able to form a triple-helix (triplex) structure in genomic DNA. Integrative WEB tools for identification and analysis of the triplex formation target DNA sequences, including PPRH sequences, associated with genes and regulatory elements (e.g., transcription factor binding sites, repeats, G-quadruplet motifs, SNPs, and non-protein coding regulatory DNA elements) in the human genome are publicly available (see External links).

These tools could be used to search biologically meaningful genome polypurine stretches, help to understand biological roles of the natural paired polypurine domains like PPRH and to optimize experimental design of anti-gene treatment.
