= Small nucleolar RNA sR-tMet =

In molecular biology, small nucleolar RNA sR-tMet is a C/D box snoRNA. It was identified in the genome of the haloarchaeon Haloferax volcanii, and is found in several other haloarchaea. It guides 2'-O-methylation of the wobble residue, C34, of tRNA^{Met}.
