= Guanine tetrad =

Structure in molecular biology

== Structure ==
Left: A guanine tetrad featuring a central cation Right: Three guanine tetrads contributing to the structure of a G-quadruplex

A guanine tetrad (also known as a G-tetrad or G-quartet) is a square planar structure composed of four nonadjacent guanine bases interacting through Hoogsteen-style hydrogen bonding. Two or more guanine tetrads can interact through π-π stacking to form G-quadruplexes. Guanine tetrads are formed by RNA or DNA sequences rich in guanine, such as GGGGC.

== Stabilization ==
Guanine tetrads are stabilized by central monovalent cations, such as lithium, sodium, potassium, rubidium, or caesium. They are more stable when stacked due to intermolecular forces between layers. The sugar-phosphate backbone of DNA can also assist in stability.

== Biological Functions ==
Guanine tetrads can influence recombination, replication, and transcription. For instance, guanine tetrads are found in the promoter region of the Myc family of oncogenes. They also function in immunoglobulin class switching and may play a role in the genome of HIV. Guanine tetrads appear frequently in the telomeric regions of DNA.

Guanine tetrads may play a role in the dimerization of non-endogenous RNAs to facilitate the replication of some viruses. Guanine tetrads dimerize through their 5' ends since it is more energetically favorable.

== See also ==
- G-quadruplex
- Hoogsteen base pair
- Heterochromatin
- Regulation of gene expression
- Guanine
- Telomere
