= Hoogsteen base pair =

Nucleic acid pairing variations

Chemical structures for Watson–Crick and Hoogsteen A•T and G•C+ base pairs. The Hoogsteen geometry can be achieved by purine rotation around the glycosidic bond (χ) and base-flipping (θ), affecting simultaneously C8 and C1′ (yellow).

A Hoogsteen base pair is a variation of base-pairing in nucleic acids such as the A•T pair. In this manner, two nucleobases, one on each strand, can be held together by hydrogen bonds in the major groove. Specifically, it happens when a pyrimidine base (C/T) uses its Watson–Crick (anti, N^{3}–C^{4}) face to bind the syn (N^{6}–N^{7}) face of a purine (A/G).

Adenine, which is not a pyrimidine, is capable of using its anti (N^{1}–N^{6}) face to pair with the syn face of a purine to form a Hoogsteen-like base pair. Guanine can form a similar interaction with another purine base, forming a rigid cycle called a guanine tetrad in the case of four guanines. These are also "Hoogsteen base pairs" under the expanded understanding as anti-syn interaction.

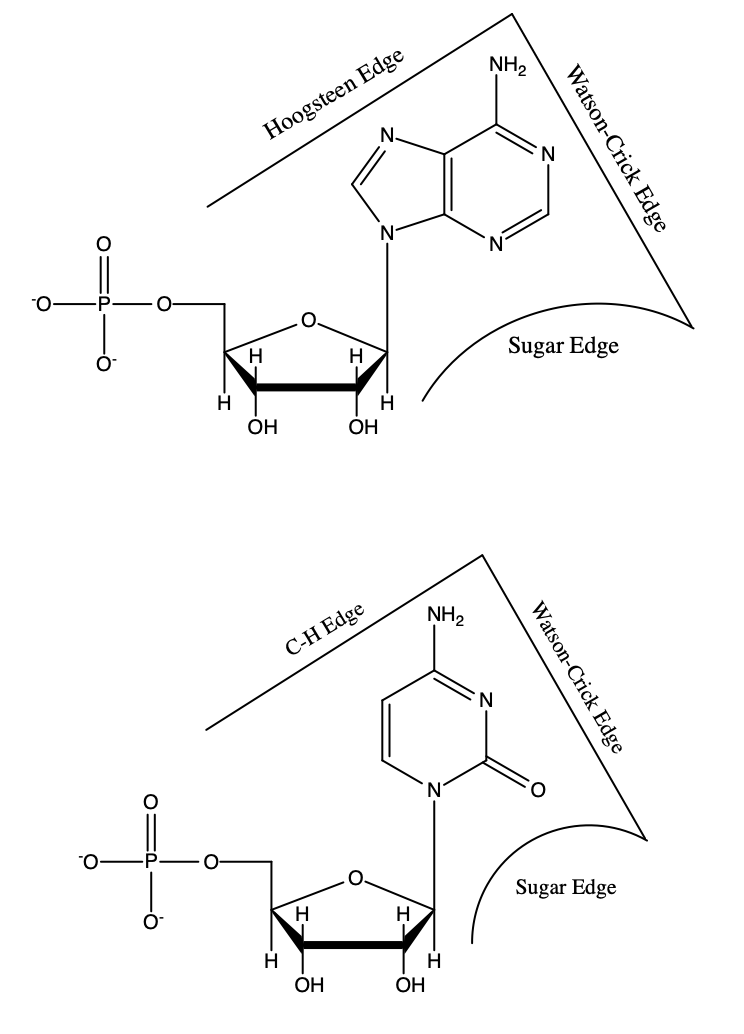
Base pairing edge of nucleobases under the general view. Top figure is an example of a purine (Adenine) where the edges are known as Watson-Crick (anti), Hoogsteen (syn), and Sugar Edges. Bottom figure is an example of a Pyrimidine (Cytosine) with the Watson-Crick (anti), C-H (syn), and Sugar Edges.

A reverse Hoogsteen base pair is when a pyrimidine's syn (N^{3}–C^{2}) face binds a purine's syn face. Under a systemic view of non-canonical base pairing, Hoogsteen base pairs (in the expanded sense) are called Watson-Crick/Hoogsteen, based on what faces are interacting (the syn face is called the Hoogsteen face). The reverse Hoogsteen base pair is called "Hoogsteen/Hoogsteen".

== Notation ==
This article employs the "•" character in describing any noncovalent interaction, which can include Hoogsteen, reverse Hoogsteen, and Watson-Crick base pairs, in line with IUPAC's 1970 recommendation.

According to the IUPAC, "-" is not acceptable because it implies covalent linkage and neither are ":" and "/" because they can be mistaken as ratios. Not using any symbol is also unacceptable because it can be confused with a (covalent) polymer sequence.

IUPAC makes no specific recommendation for differentiating types of noncovalent bonds. When it is necessary to differentiate, this article uses "*" for the Hoogsteen pair, "□" for the Watson-Crick pair, and "△" for the reverse Hoogsteen pair. The typical Hogsteen pairs are A*T and G*C^{+} (note the charge on cytidine, indicating protonation).

== History ==
Ten years after James Watson and Francis Crick published their model of the DNA double helix, Karst Hoogsteen reported a crystal structure of a complex in which analogues of A and T formed a base pair that had a different geometry from that described by Watson and Crick. Similarly, an alternative base-pairing geometry can occur for G•C pairs. Hoogsteen pointed out that if the alternative hydrogen-bonding patterns were present in DNA, then the double helix would have to assume a quite different shape. Hoogsteen base pairs are observed in alternative structures such as the four-stranded G-quadruplex structures that form in DNA and RNA.

== Chemical properties ==
Hoogsteen pairs have quite different properties from Watson–Crick base pairs. The angle between the two glycosidic bonds (ca. 80° in the A*T pair) is larger and the C1′–C1′ distance (ca. 860 pm or 8.6 Å) is smaller than in the regular geometry. In some cases, called reversed Hoogsteen base pairs, one base is rotated 180° with respect to the other.

In some DNA sequences, especially CA and TA dinucleotides, Hoogsteen base pairs exist as transient entities that are present in thermal equilibrium with standard Watson–Crick base pairs. The detection of the transient species required the use of NMR relaxation dispersion spectroscopy applied to macromolecules.

Hoogsteen base pairs have been observed in protein–DNA complexes. Some proteins have evolved to recognize only one base-pair type, and use intermolecular interactions to shift the equilibrium between the two geometries.

DNA has many features that allow its sequence-specific recognition by proteins. This recognition was originally thought to primarily involve specific hydrogen-bonding interactions between amino-acid side chains and bases. But it soon became clear that there was no identifiable one-to-one correspondence — that is, there was no simple code to be read. Part of the problem is that DNA can undergo conformational changes that distort the classical double helix. The resulting variations alter the presentation of DNA bases to proteins molecules and thus affect the recognition mechanism.

As distortions in the double helix are themselves are dependent on base sequence, proteins are able to recognize DNA in a manner similar to the way that they recognize other proteins and small ligand molecules, i.e. via geometric shape (instead of the specific sequence). For example, stretches of A and T bases can lead to narrowing the minor groove of DNA (the narrower of the two grooves in the double helix), resulting in enhanced local negative electrostatic potentials which in turn creates binding sites for positively charged arginine amino-acid residues on the protein.

== Triplex structures ==
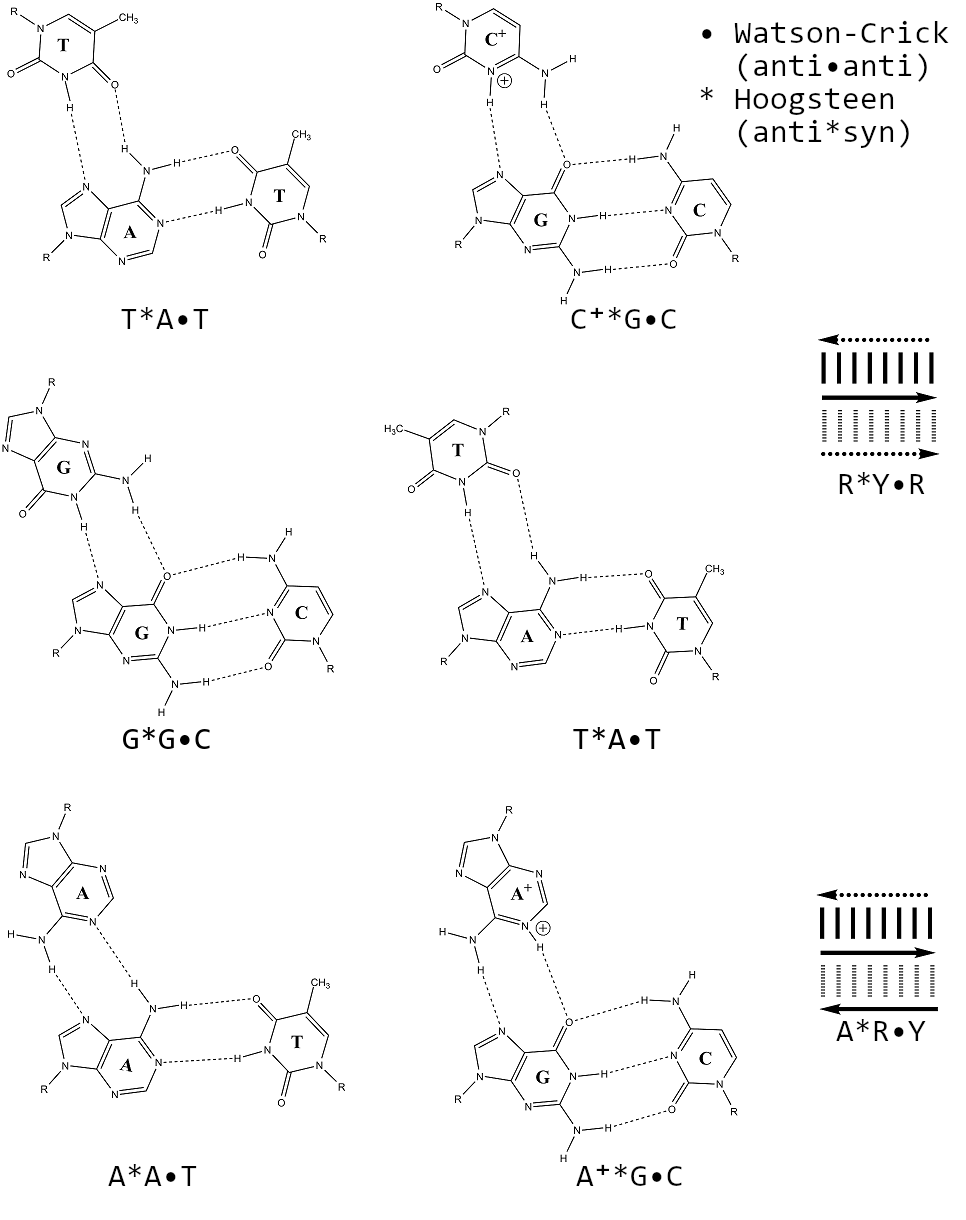
Base triads in a DNA triple helix structure. Includes four standard Hogsteen examples and two nonstandard adenine examples.

This non-Watson–Crick base-pairing allows the third strands to wind around the duplexes, which are assembled in the Watson–Crick pattern, and form triple-stranded helices such as (poly(dA)•2poly(dT) = poly(dT)*poly(dA)□poly(dT)) and (poly(rG)•2poly(rC) = poly(rC)*poly(rG)□poly(rC)).

The reverse Hogsteen pair can be seen in three-dimensional structures of transfer RNA, as T54△A58 and U8△A14.

== Quadruplex structures ==
Left: A guanine tetrad featuring a central cation Right: Three guanine tetrads contributing to the structure of a G-quadruplex

As mentioned before, four guanine bases can form a rigid cycle called a guanine tetrad. This allows formation of secondary structures of G-rich single stranded DNA and RNA called G-quadruplexes (G4-DNA and G4-RNA). Evidence exists for both in vitro and in vivo formation of G4s. Genomic G4s have been suggested to regulate gene transcription and at the RNA level inhibit protein synthesis through steric inhibition of ribosome function. It needs four triplets of G, separated by short spacers. This permits assembly of planar quartets which are composed of stacked associations of Hoogsteen bonded guanine molecules.

== See also ==
- Wobble base pair
- Nucleic acid tertiary structure
- Polypurine reverse-Hoogsteen hairpins (PPRHs), oligonucleotides that can bind either DNA or RNA and decrease gene expression.
