= Wolfram Saenger =

German biochemist (1939–2026)

- Born: 23 April 1939
- Died: 16 February 2026 (aged 86)
- Known for: X-ray crystallography of membrane proteins
- Awards: Gottfried Wilhelm Leibniz Prize, Humboldt Prize
- Scientific career
- Fields: Biochemistry and protein crystallogtaphy
- Institutions: Max Planck Institute for Experimental Medicine, Harvard Medical School, Free University of Berlin, National Academy of Sciences

Wolfram Saenger (23 April 1939 – 16 February 2026) was a German biochemist and protein biochemist known for his pioneering contributions to nucleic acid crystallography and structural biology. Over a scientific career spanning more than four decades, he worked at Harvard University (Harvard Medical School, Max Planck Institute for Experimental Medicine, and the Free University of Berlin, where he led the Institute for Crystallography until his retirement in 2011.

== Life and career ==
Saenger played a major role in establishing structural biology and nucleic acid crystallography in Germany and Europe. His research focused on the structural chemistry of nucleic acids, protein–nucleic acid complexes, hydration patterns in DNA, and molecular recognition at atomic resolution. His work contributed significantly to understanding base pairing, stacking interactions, and structural principles governing biological macromolecules.

At the Free University of Berlin, he built one of the leading crystallography groups in Germany and trained numerous doctoral students and postdoctoral researchers who later became academic leaders in structural biology, chemistry, and biophysics.

He received the Gottfried Wilhelm Leibniz Prize (1987) of the Deutsche Forschungsgemeinschaft which is the highest honor awarded for achievements in research in Germany, and the Humboldt Prize (1988) and was awarded the Carl Hermann Medal in 2004 for his contributions to crystallography.

Saenger authored ten books, including the widely used reference work Principles of Nucleic Acid Structure published by Springer, and published more than 500 scientific articles. His publications span fundamental studies of DNA structure, hydrogen bonding networks, nucleic acid hydration, protein–nucleic acid recognition, and early structural analyses of large biological complexes.

He was a member of the National Academy of Sciences and was internationally recognized for shaping modern structural biology through both his research and mentorship.

Saenger died on 16 February 2026, at the age of 86.

== Partial list of major scientific contributions ==
1. Water Molecule in Hydrophobic Surroundings: Structure of alpha-Cyclodextrin-Hexahydrate (C_{6}H_{10}O_{5})_{6}·6H_{2}O, Nature, 1972
2. Circular hydrogen bonds, Nature, 1979
3. Specific protein-nucleic acid recognition in ribonuclease T1−2'-guanylic acid complex: an X-ray study, Nature 1982
4. DNA conformation is determined by economics in the hydration of phosphate groups, Nature 1986
5. Long-range structural changes in proteinase K triggered by calcium ion removal, Nature 1989
6. Three-dimensional structure of the E. coli DMA-binding protein FIS, Nature 1991
7. Three-dimensional structure of system I of photosynthesis at 6 Å resolution, Nature 1993
8. Crystal structure of beta-D-cellotetraose hemihydrate with implications for the structure of cellulose II, Science 1994
9. Structure of the Tet repressor-tetracycline complex and regulation of antibiotic resistance, Science 1994
10. Characterization of non-inducible Tet repressor mutants suggests conformational changes necessary for induction, Nature Structural Biology 1995
11. Photosystem I at 4 Å resolution represents the first structural model of a joint photosynthetic reaction centre and core antenna system, Nature Structural Biology 1996
12. Structural basis of gene regulation by the tetracycline inducible Tet repressor− operator system, Nature Structural Biology 2000
13. Crystal structure of photosystem II from Synechococcus elongatus at 3.8 Å resolution, Nature 2001
14. Three-dimensional structure of cyanobacterial Photosystem I at 2.5 Å resolution, Nature 2001
15. Towards complete cofactor arrangement in the 3.0 Å resolution structure of photosystem II, Nature 2005
16. Where water is oxidized to dioxygen: structure of the photosynthetic Mn4Ca cluster, Science 2006
17. Cyanobacterial photosystem II at 2.9 Å resolution and the role of quinones, lipids, channels and chloride, Nature Structural & Molecular Biology 2009
