= Karst Hoogsteen =

American biochemist

- Born: 1 October 1923; Groningen
- Died: 10 August 2015 (aged 91); Westfield, New Jersey
- Education: University of Groningen
- Known for: Hoogsteen base pairs
- Scientific career
- Fields: Physics; Molecular biology
- Workplaces: California Institute of Technology, Merck Sharp and Dohme
- Thesis: The crystal structure of trismethylsulfonylmethane-NH4 (May 1957)
- Doctoral advisor: Pieter Terpstra

Karst Hoogsteen (October 1, 1923 – August 10, 2015) was a Dutch-born American biochemist famous for noting a new base-pairing form in DNA, now called Hoogsteen base pairs. These base pairings intercede in the Watson–Crick base pairing, forging a base pair 'triplex'. The base pairs use the N7 nitrogen atom as the acceptor, rather than the N1 as observed in Watson-Crick base pairing. This leads to a twisted, non-linear arrangement.
