= Ribosomal rescue factor =

Ribosomal rescue factor may refer to:

- Alternative ribosome-rescue factor A
- Alternative ribosome-rescue factor B
