= OAZ =

OAZ may refer to:

- OAZ1, ornithine decarboxylase antizyme, an enzyme that in humans is encoded by the OAZ1 gene
- OAZ2, ornithine decarboxylase antizyme 2, an enzyme that in humans is encoded by the OAZ2 gene
- Outer Artillery Zone, a narrow belt along the coast from Suffolk to Sussex in the Air Defence of Great Britain
