= Ornithine decarboxylase antizyme =

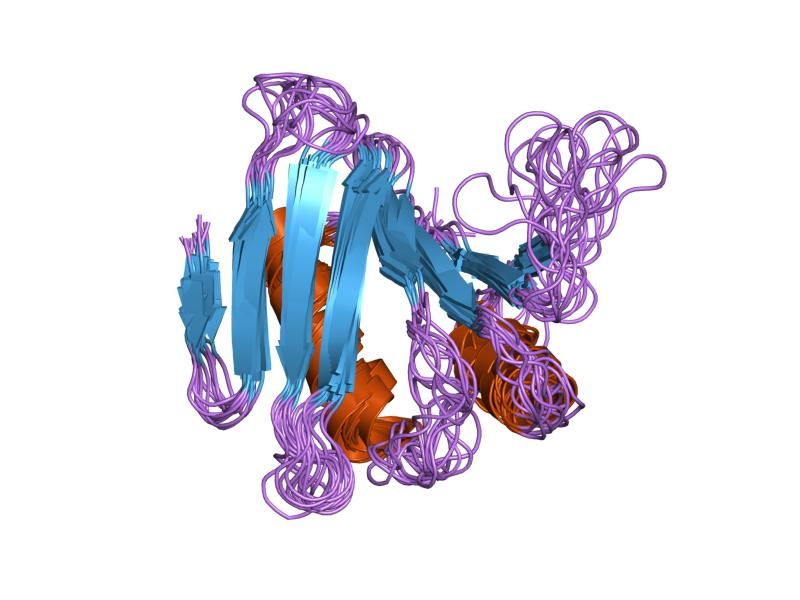
- NMR structure of antizyme isoform 1 from rat

Identifiers
- Symbol: ODC_AZ
- Pfam: PF02100
- InterPro: IPR002993
- PROSITE: PDOC01039
Available protein structures:
- PDB: IPR002993 PF02100 (ECOD; PDBsum)
- AlphaFold: IPR002993; PF02100

In molecular biology, Ornithine decarboxylase antizyme (ODC-AZ) is an ornithine decarboxylase inhibitor. It binds to, and destabilises, ornithine decarboxylase (ODC), a key enzyme in polyamine synthesis. ODC is then rapidly degraded. It was first characterized in 1981. The expression of ODC-AZ requires programmed, ribosomal frameshifting which is modulated according to the cellular concentration of polyamines. High levels of polyamines induce a +1 ribosomal frameshift in the translation of mRNA for the antizyme leading to the expression of a full-length protein. At least two forms of ODC-AZ exist in mammals and the protein has been found in Drosophila (protein Gutfeeling) as well as in Saccharomyces yeast (encoded by the OAZ1 gene).

Human genes encoding Ornithine decarboxylase antizymes are OAZ1, OAZ2, and OAZ3.
