= Slippery sequence =

Nucleotide pattern causing frameshifting

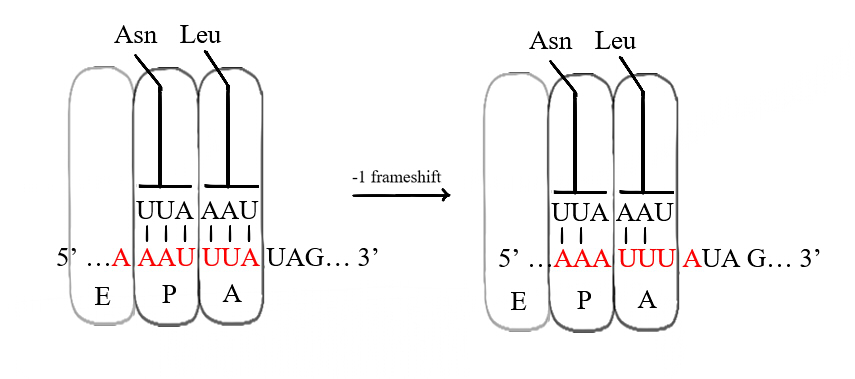
Tandem slippage of 2 tRNAs at rous sarcoma virus slippery sequence. After the frameshift, new base pairings are correct at the first and second nucleotides but incorrect at wobble position. E, P, and A sites of the ribosome are indicated. Location of growing polypeptide chain is not indicated in image because there is not yet consensus on whether the −1 slip occurs before or after polypeptide is transferred from P-site tRNA to A-site tRNA (in this case from the Asn tRNA to the Leu tRNA).

A slippery sequence is a small section of codon nucleotide sequences (usually UUUAAAC) that controls the rate and chance of ribosomal frameshifting. A slippery sequence causes a faster ribosomal transfer which in turn can cause the reading ribosome to "slip." This allows a tRNA to shift by 1 base (−1) after it has paired with its anticodon, changing the reading frame. A −1 frameshift triggered by such a sequence is a programmed −1 ribosomal frameshift. It is followed by a spacer region, and an RNA secondary structure. Such sequences are common in virus polyproteins.

The frameshift occurs due to wobble pairing. The Gibbs free energy of secondary structures downstream give a hint at how often frameshift happens. Tension on the mRNA molecule also plays a role. A list of slippery sequences found in animal viruses is available from Huang et al.

Slippery sequences that cause a 2-base slip (−2 frameshift) have been constructed out of the HIV UUUUUUA sequence.

== See also ==
- Nucleic acid tertiary structure
- Open reading frame
- Ribosomal frameshifting
- Translational frameshift
- Transposable element
