= Ribosomal pause =

Queueing of ribosomes during protein synthesis

The ribosome assembles polymeric protein molecules whose sequence is controlled by the sequence of messenger RNA molecules. This is required by all living cells and associated viruses.

Ribosomal pause refers to the queueing or stacking of ribosomes during translation of the nucleotide sequence of mRNA transcripts. These transcripts are decoded and converted into an amino acid sequence during protein synthesis by ribosomes. Due to the pause sites of some mRNAs, there is a disturbance caused in translation. Ribosomal pausing occurs in both eukaryotes and prokaryotes. A more severe pause is known as a ribosomal stall.

It's been known since the 1980s that different mRNAs are translated at different rates. The main reason for these differences was thought to be the concentration of varieties of rare tRNAs limiting the rate at which some transcripts could be decoded. However, with research techniques such as ribosome profiling, it was found that at certain sites there were higher concentrations of ribosomes than average, and these pause sites were tested with specific codons. No link was found between the occupancy of specific codons and amount of their tRNAs. Thus, the early findings about rare tRNAs causing pause sites don't seem plausible.

Two techniques can localize the ribosomal pause site in vivo; a micrococcal nuclease protection assay and isolation of polysomal transcript. Isolation of polysomal transcripts occurs by centrifuging tissue extracts through a sucrose cushion with translation elongation inhibitors, for example cycloheximide.

Ribosome pausing can be detected during preprolactin synthesis on free polysomes, when the ribosome is paused the other ribosomes are tightly stacked together. When the ribosome pauses, during translation, the fragments that started to translate before the pause took place are overrepresented. However, along with the mRNA if the ribosome pauses then specific bands will be improved in the trailing edge of the ribosome.

Some of the elongation inhibitors, such as: cycloheximide (in eukaryotes) or chloramphenicol, cause the ribosomes to pause and to accumulate in the start codons. Elongation Factor P regulates the ribosomal pause at polyproline in bacteria, and when there is no EFP the density of ribosomes decreases from the polyproline motifs. If there are multiple ribosome pauses, then the EFP won't resolve it.

== Resolution and effects on gene expression ==
Some forms of ribosomal pause are reversible without needing to discard the translated peptide and mRNA. This sort, usually described as a slowdown, is usually caused by polyproline stretches (resolved by EFP or eIF5A) and uncharged tRNA. Slowdowns are important for the cell to control how much protein is produced; it also aids co-translational folding of the nascent polypeptide on the ribosome, and delays protein translation while its encoding mRNA; this can trigger ribosomal frameshifting.

More severe "stalls" can be caused an actual lack of tRNA or by the mRNA terminating without a stop codon. In this case, ribosomal quality control (RQC) performs crisis rescue by translational abandonment. This releases the ribosome from the mRNA. The incomplete polypeptide is targeted for destruction; in eukaryotes, mRNA no-go decay is also triggered.

It is difficult for RQC machinery to differentiate between a slowdown and a stall. It is possible for a mRNA sequence that normally produces a protein slowly to produce nothing instead due to intervention by RQC under different conditions.

=== Rescue mechanisms ===
In bacteria, three rescue mechanisms are known.

- The main, universal system involves transfer-messenger RNA (tmRNA) and SmpB. The tRNA first binds to the ribosome like a tRNA, then with SmpB's help shifts into the mRNA position to translate a short peptide ending on a normal stop codon.
- Alternative ribosome-rescue factor A (ArfA) is an alternative system in E. coli. It recruits RF2.
- Alternative ribosome-rescue factor B (ArfB) is another alternative from E. coli. It works like a GGQ-release factor itself, releasing the peptide from tRNA. At the same time, it fits into the mRNA tunnel to remove the mRNA.

In eukaryotes, the main mechanism involves PELO:HBS1L.

== Advantage of the ribosomal pause ==
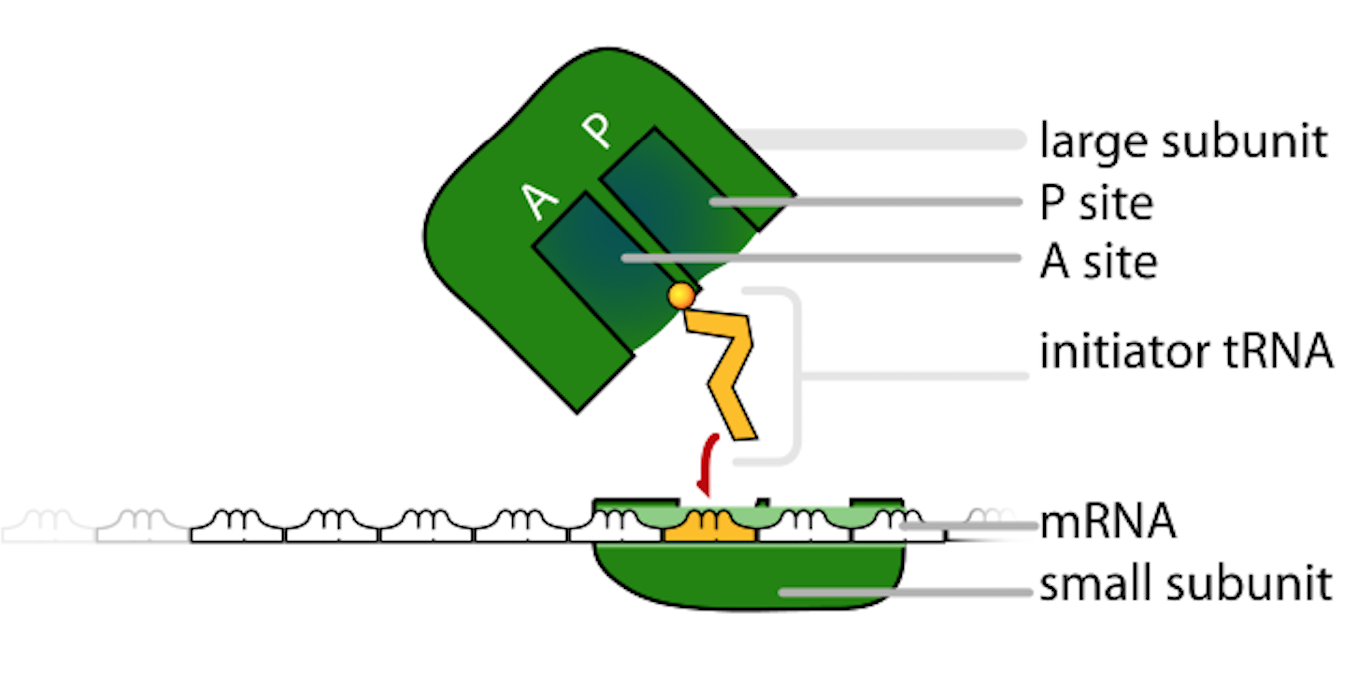
Structure of the Ribosome

When the ribosome movement on the mRNA is not linear, the ribosome gets paused at different regions without a precise reason. The ribosome pause position will help to identify the mRNA sequence features, structure, and the transacting factor that modulates this process. The advantage of ribosomal pause sites that are located at protein domain boundaries are aiding the folding of a protein. There are times when the ribosomal pause does not cause an advantage and it needs to be restricted. In translation, elF5A inhibits ribosomal pausing for translation to function better. Ribosomal pausing can cause more non-canonical start codons without elF5A in eukaryotic cells. When there is a lack of elF5A in the eukaryotic cell, it can cause an increase in ribosomal pausing. The ribosomal pausing process can also be used by amino acids to control translation.

== The location of the ribosome pause event in vitro ==
It is known that ribosomes pause at distinct sites, but the reasons for these pauses are mostly unknown. Also, the ribosome pauses if the pseudoknot is disrupted. 10% of the ribosome pauses at the pseudoknot and 4% of the ribosomes are terminated. Before the ribosome is obstructed it passes the pseudoknot. An assay was put together by a group from the University of California in an effort to show a model of mRNA. The translation was monitored in two in vitro systems. It was found that translating ribosomes aren't uniformly distributed along an mRNA. Protein folding in vivo is also important and is related to protein synthesis. For finding the location of the ribosomal pause in vivo, the methods that have been used to find the ribosomal pause in vitro can be changed to find these specific locations in vivo.

== Ribosome profiling ==
Ribosome profiling is a method that can reveal pausing sites through sequencing the ribosome protected fragments (RPFs or footprints) to map ribosome occupancy on the mRNA. Ribosome profiling has the ability to reveal the ribosome pause sites in the whole transcriptome. When the kinetics layer is added, it discloses the time of the pause, and the translation takes place. Ribosome profiling is however still in early stages and has biases that need to be explored further. Ribosome profiling allows for translation to be measured more accurately and precisely. During this process, translation needs to be stopped in order for ribosome profiling to be performed. This may cause a problem with ribosome profiling because the methods that are used to stop translation in an experiment can impact the outcome, which causes incorrect results. Ribosome profiling is useful for getting specific information on translation and the process of protein synthesis.

== See also ==
- Translational frameshift
- HIV Ribosomal frameshift signal
- Coronavirus frameshifting stimulation element
- Ribosomal frameshift
