= Insertion sequence IS1222 ribosomal frameshifting element =

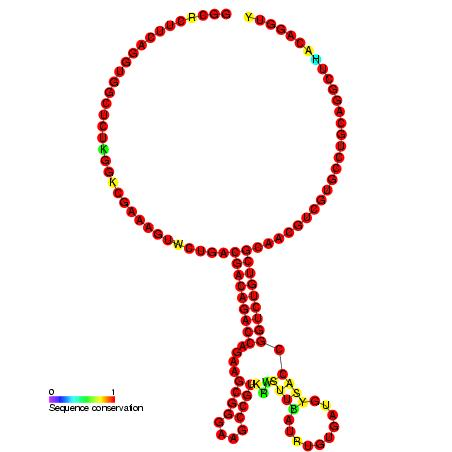
- Predicted secondary structure and sequence conservation of IS1222_FSE

Identifiers
- Symbol: IS1222_FSE
- Rfam: RF00383

Other data
- RNA type: Cis-reg; frameshift_element
- Domain(s): Bacteria
- SO: SO:0000233
- PDB structures: PDBe

In molecular cell biology the Insertion sequence IS1222 ribosomal frameshifting element is an RNA element found in the insertion sequence IS222. The ribosomal frameshifting element stimulates frameshifting which is known to be required for transposition.
