= Mir-281 microRNA precursor family =

mir-281

Identifiers
- Symbol: mir-281
- Rfam: RF00967
- miRBase family: 2

Other data
- RNA type: microRNA
- Domain(s): Eukaryota;
- PDB structures: PDBe

In molecular biology, mir-281 microRNA is a short RNA molecule. MicroRNAs function to regulate the expression levels of other genes by several mechanisms. mir-281 is found in an intron of the Drosophila ornithine decarboxylase antizyme (ODA) gene. Using the RACE technique the pri-miRNA was shown to be 2,149 nucleotides in length. The expression level of the microRNA was found to be independent of the level of ODA.

== See also ==
- MicroRNA
