= Coronavirus 5′ UTR =

Coronavirus genomes are positive-sense single-stranded RNA molecules with an untranslated region (UTR) at the 5′ end which is called the 5′ UTR. The 5′ UTR is responsible for important biological functions, such as viral replication, transcription and packaging. The 5′ UTR has a conserved RNA secondary structure but different Coronavirus genera (Alpha-, Beta-, Gamma-, and Deltacoronaviruses) have different structural features described below.

== Alphacoronavirus 5′ UTR ==
Consensus secondary structure and sequence conservation of aCoV-5UTR (Rfam RF03116).

The first 150 to 200 nucleotides within the 5′ UTR of Alphacoronaviruses are highly structured and shown to be conserved on the structural level. The 5′ UTRs are predicted to contain three conserved stem-loops:

- SL1 is important for viral replication, most likely playing a role in the template-switch of viral subgenomic RNA (sgRNA) transcription. Mutations of the upper part of SL1 seem to have a higher impact of viral replication level.
- SL2 is crucial for viral viability. Nucleotides are interchangeable as long as the structure remains stable. Disrupting any G-C pairing causes major defects in viral replication.
- SL4 is hypothesised to play a role in directing subgenomic RNA synthesis during viral replication.

Downstream of SL4 lies SL5, which overlaps with the first ORF of the viral genome. The three terminal loops of SL5 contain a conserved sequence 5′-UUCCGU-3′ and are thought to act as the packaging signal.

== Betacoronavirus 5′ UTR ==
Consensus secondary structure and sequence conservation of bCoV-5UTR (Rfam RF03117). The first 3 helices are SL1, SL2 and SL4 and the last 3 are parts of SL5.

Similar to Alphacoronavirus, the first 150 to 200 nucleotides within the Betacoronavirus 5′ UTR are highly structured and contains three conserved stem-loops (SL1, SL2 and SL4).

SARS-CoV and BCoV have an additional stem-loop, called SL3, which contains the TRS-L sequence in its loop region. This is crucial for sgRNA synthesis during viral replication. However, according to predictions, SL3 is not stable in other Betacoronaviruses like MHV.

Similar to other Sarbecoviruses, the 5′ UTR of SARS-CoV-2 is predicted to consist of 4 distinct stem-loops, namely SL1, SL2, SL3 and SL4. Further, there is a larger structure, SL5, present, which includes the first ORFs of the polyprotein pp1a. Note, that SL3 is typically present in SARS coronaviruses, but not necessarily conserved among other Betacoronaviruses.

== Gammacoronavirus 5′ UTR ==
The 5′ UTR of Gammacoronaviruses is similar to the 5′ UTRs of Alpha- and Betacoronaviruses, as they also contain three helices denoted as SL1, SL2 and SL4. Further, in a subset of Gammacoronaviruses a third stem-loop, SL3, is observed. SL1 and SL2 have major impacts of the level of viral replication, whereas SL4 is hypothesized to play a role as a "spacer" during the template-switch of sgRNA synthesis.

== Deltacoronavirus 5′ UTR ==
Consensus secondary structure and sequence conservation of dCoV-5UTR (Rfam RF03119).

The 5′UTR of Deltacoronaviruses is similar to the 5′UTRs of Alpha- and Betacoronaviruses, as they also contain three helices denoted as SL1, SL2 and SL4. Predictions show a conserved fourth stem-loop (SL3) between SL2 and SL4, sometimes observed in Beta- and Gammacoronaviruses as well. SL3 usually exposes the TRS-L sequence in the loop region.

== See also ==
- Coronavirus 3′ UTR
- Coronavirus 3′ UTR pseudoknot
- Coronavirus 3′ stem-loop II-like motif (s2m)
- Coronavirus frameshifting stimulation element
- Coronavirus packaging signal
