= Erbin (protein) =

Protein found in humans

ERBIN
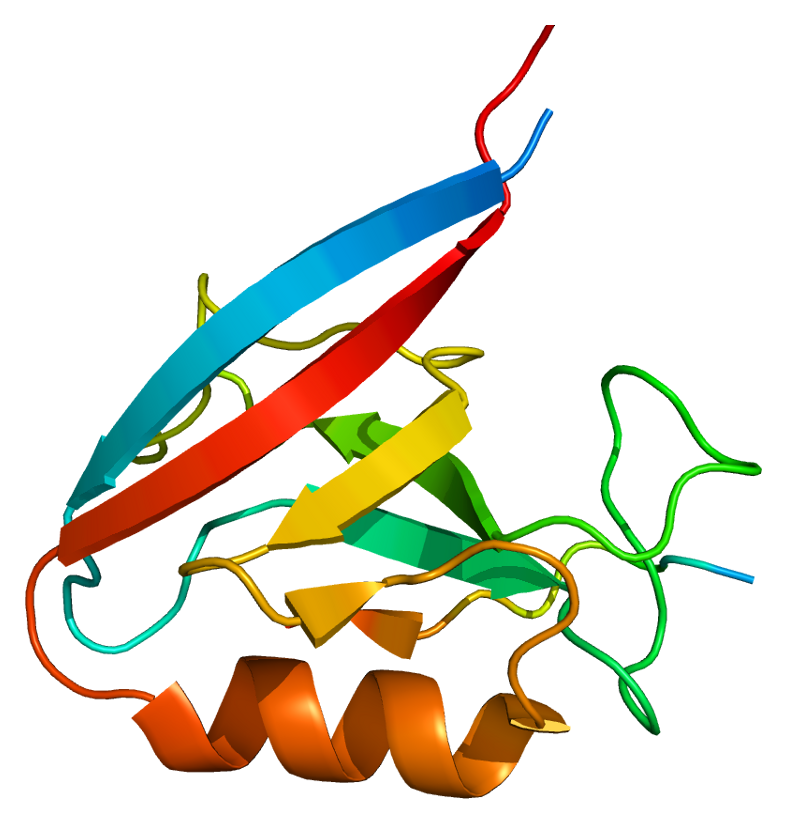

Identifiers
- Aliases: ERBIN, HEL-S-78, LAP2, ERBB2IP, erbb2 interacting protein
- External IDs: OMIM: 606944; MGI: 1890169; GeneCards: ERBIN
Available structures
PDB	Ortholog search: PDBe RCSB
PDB	List of PDB id codes 1MFG, 1MFL, 1N7T, 2H3L, 2QBW, 3CH8

Gene location (Human)
Chr.	Chromosome 5 (human)
Band	5q12.3	Start	65,926,556 bp
Band	5q12.3	End	66,082,546 bp

Gene location (Mouse)
Chr.	Chromosome 13 (mouse)
Band	13|13 D1	Start	103,955,295 bp
Band	13|13 D1	End	104,057,022 bp
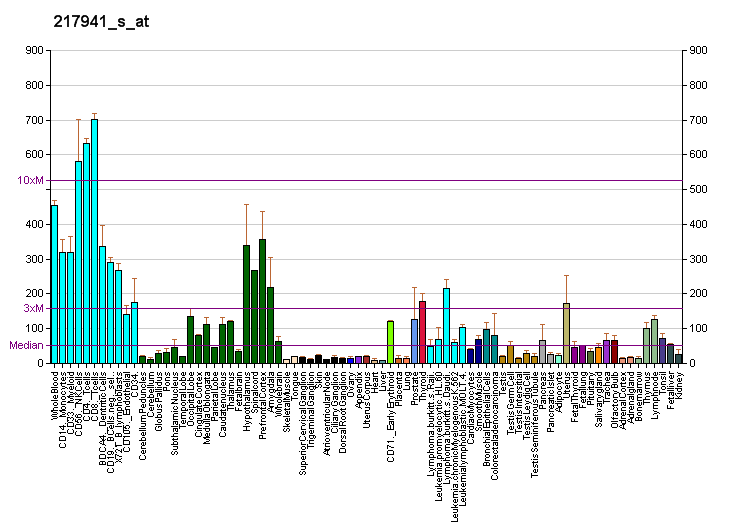
RNA expression pattern
Bgee	Human / Mouse (ortholog); Top expressed in: corpus callosum; external globus pallidus; optic nerve; subthalamic nucleus; internal globus pallidus; inferior ganglion of vagus nerve; pars reticulata; medulla oblongata; mucosa of paranasal sinus; superior vestibular nucleus / Top expressed in: parotid gland; submandibular gland; left lung lobe; left colon; conjunctival fornix; epithelium of small intestine; lacrimal gland; seminal vesicula; Gonadal ridge; mesenteric lymph nodes; More reference expression data
BioGPS	More reference expression data
Gene ontology
Molecular function	structural constituent of cytoskeleton; ErbB-2 class receptor binding; protein binding; signaling receptor binding
Cellular component	cytoplasm; nuclear membrane; membrane; plasma membrane; hemidesmosome; basement membrane; cell junction; basal plasma membrane; basolateral plasma membrane; nucleus; nuclear speck; neuromuscular junction; postsynapse; glutamatergic synapse; postsynaptic specialization
Biological process	negative regulation of monocyte chemotactic protein-1 production; protein targeting; epidermal growth factor receptor signaling pathway; negative regulation of nucleotide-binding oligomerization domain containing 2 signaling pathway; cellular response to tumor necrosis factor; response to muramyl dipeptide; basal protein localization; cell growth; response to lipopolysaccharide; cell adhesion; establishment or maintenance of epithelial cell apical/basal polarity; intermediate filament cytoskeleton organization; integrin-mediated signaling pathway; negative regulation of NF-kappaB transcription factor activity; signal transduction; ERBB2 signaling pathway; regulation of postsynaptic membrane neurotransmitter receptor levels
Sources:Amigo / QuickGO
Orthologs
Databases	NCBI: entry; OMA: entry
Species	Human	Mouse
Entrez	55914	59079
Ensembl	ENSG00000112851	ENSMUSG00000021709
UniProt	Q96RT1	Q80TH2
RefSeq (mRNA)	NM_001006600; NM_001253697; NM_001253698; NM_001253699; NM_001253701 NM_018695	NM_001005868; NM_021563; NM_001289473; NM_001289474; NM_001289475
RefSeq (protein)	NP_001006600; NP_001240626; NP_001240627; NP_001240628; NP_001240630 NP_061165	NP_001005868; NP_001276402; NP_001276403; NP_001276404
Location (UCSC)	Chr 5: 65.93 – 66.08 Mb	Chr 13: 103.96 – 104.06 Mb
PubMed search
- Wikidata
View/Edit Human	View/Edit Mouse

Erbb2 interacting protein (ERBB2IP), also known as erbin, is a protein which in humans is encoded by the ERBB2IP gene. Discovered in 1997, erbin is a 200kDa protein containing a PDZ domain.

== Function ==
This gene is a member of the leucine-rich repeat and PDZ domain (LAP) family. The encoded protein contains 17 leucine-rich repeats and one PDZ domain. It binds to the unphosphorylated form of the ERBB2 protein and regulates ERBB2 function and localization. It has also been shown to affect the Ras signaling pathway by disrupting Ras-Raf interaction. Alternate transcriptional splice variants encoding different isoforms have been found for this gene, but only two of them have been characterized to date.

== Clinical significance ==
Erbin's C-terminal PDZ domain is able to bind to ErbB2, a protein tyrosine kinase which is often associated with poor prognosis in epidermal oncogenesis. Erbin's N-terminal region has been shown to disrupt Ras to Raf binding and may be, through this action, a tumor suppressing protein.

== Interactions ==
Erbin has been shown to interact with:

- Dystonin
- HER2/neu
- ITGB4
- Mothers against decapentaplegic homolog 3
- PKP4 and
- KSR1
