= Recode (database) =

RECODE

Content
- Description: frameshifting, bypassing and codon redefinition used for gene expression.

Contact
- Primary citation: Baranov & al. (2001)

Access
- Website: http://recode.genetics.utah.edu/

RECODE is a database of "programmed" frameshifts, bypassing and codon redefinition used for gene expression.

== See also ==
- Translational frameshift
