= Integrin beta 4 =

Protein-coding gene in the species Homo sapiens

ITGB4
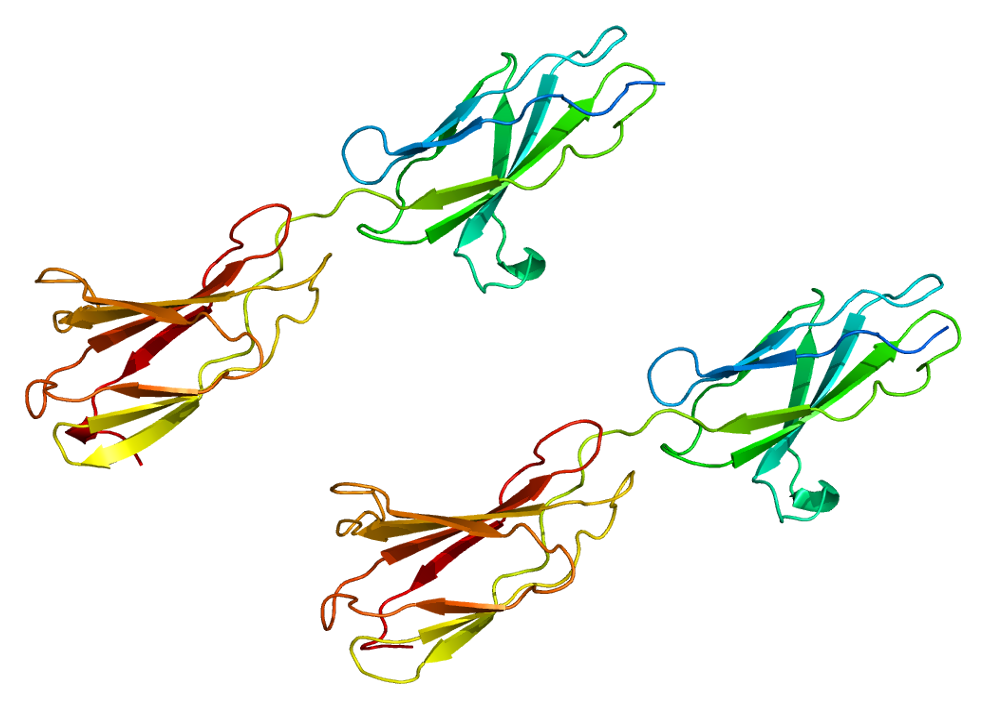

Identifiers
- Aliases: ITGB4, CD104, GP150, integrin subunit beta 4, JEB5A, JEB5B
- External IDs: OMIM: 147557; MGI: 96613; GeneCards: ITGB4
Available structures
PDB	Ortholog search: PDBe RCSB
PDB	List of PDB id codes 1QG3, 2YRZ, 3F7P, 3F7Q, 3F7R, 3FQ4, 3FSO, 3H6A, 4Q58, 4WTW, 4WTX

Gene location (Human)
Chr.	Chromosome 17 (human)
Band	17q25.1	Start	75,721,328 bp
Band	17q25.1	End	75,757,818 bp

Gene location (Mouse)
Chr.	Chromosome 11 (mouse)
Band	11 E2|11 80.91 cM	Start	115,865,535 bp
Band	11 E2|11 80.91 cM	End	115,899,238 bp
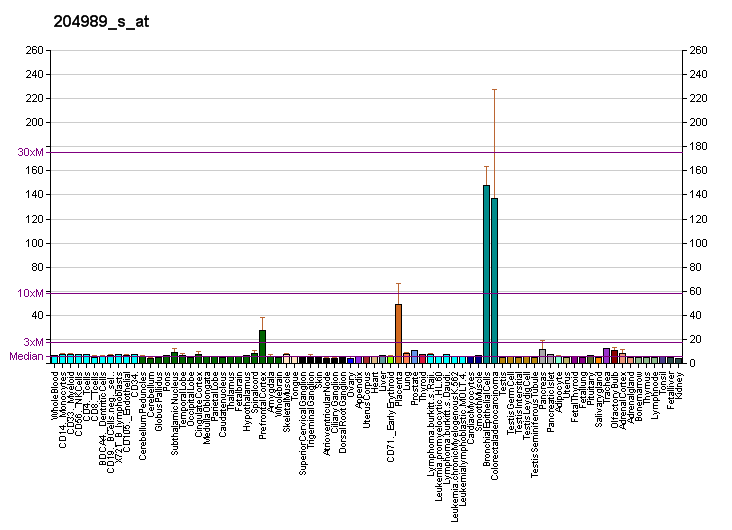

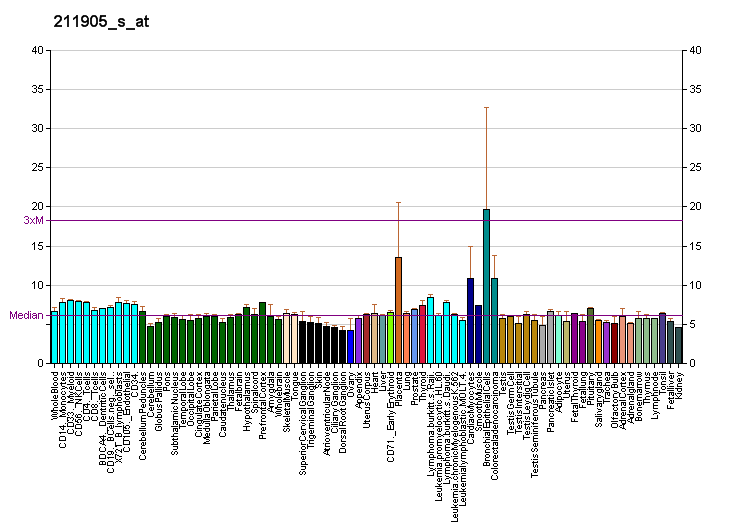

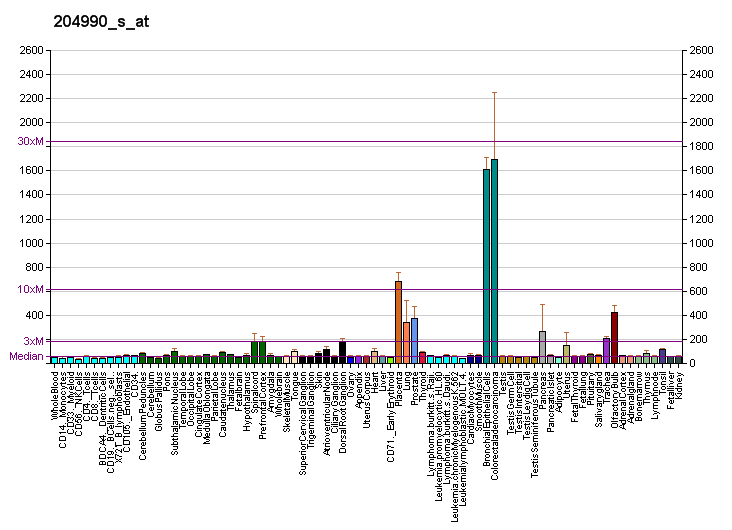
RNA expression pattern
Bgee	Human / Mouse (ortholog); Top expressed in: tibial nerve; minor salivary glands; skin of leg; sural nerve; skin of abdomen; olfactory zone of nasal mucosa; mucosa of transverse colon; right uterine tube; body of stomach; gastric mucosa / Top expressed in: corneal stroma; lip; sciatic nerve; molar; Ileal epithelium; esophagus; pyloric antrum; large intestine; colon; skin of external ear; More reference expression data
BioGPS	More reference expression data
Gene ontology
Molecular function	protein binding; G protein-coupled receptor binding; neuregulin binding; insulin-like growth factor I binding; integrin binding
Cellular component	integral component of membrane; membrane; receptor complex; plasma membrane; hemidesmosome; cell surface; integrin complex; cell junction; cell leading edge; extracellular exosome; nucleus; focal adhesion
Biological process	hemidesmosome assembly; renal system development; nail development; cell motility; extracellular matrix organization; autophagy; cell communication; cell adhesion; response to wounding; mesodermal cell differentiation; integrin-mediated signaling pathway; digestive tract development; cell-matrix adhesion; skin development; amelogenesis; cell migration; cell adhesion mediated by integrin
Sources:Amigo / QuickGO
Orthologs
Databases	NCBI: entry; OMA: entry
Species	Human	Mouse
Entrez	3691	192897
Ensembl	ENSG00000132470	ENSMUSG00000020758
UniProt	P16144	A2A863
RefSeq (mRNA)	NM_000213; NM_001005619; NM_001005731; NM_001321123	NM_001005608; NM_133663
RefSeq (protein)	NP_000204; NP_001005619; NP_001005731; NP_001308052	NP_001005608; NP_598424; NP_001392055; NP_001392056
Location (UCSC)	Chr 17: 75.72 – 75.76 Mb	Chr 11: 115.87 – 115.9 Mb
PubMed search
- Wikidata
View/Edit Human	View/Edit Mouse

Integrin, beta 4 (ITGB4) also known as CD104 (Cluster of Differentiation 104), is a human gene.

== Function ==
Integrins are heterodimers composed of alpha and beta subunits, that are noncovalently associated transmembrane glycoprotein receptors. Different combinations of alpha and beta polypeptides form complexes that vary in their ligand-binding specificities. Integrins mediate cell-matrix or cell-cell adhesion, and transduced signals that regulate gene expression and cell growth. This gene encodes the integrin beta 4 subunit, a receptor for the laminins. This subunit tends to associate with alpha 6 subunit and is likely to play a pivotal role in the biology of invasive carcinoma. Mutations in this gene are associated with epidermolysis bullosa with pyloric atresia. Multiple alternatively spliced transcript variants encoding distinct isoforms have been found for this gene.

== Interactions ==
ITGB4 has been shown to interact with Collagen, type XVII, alpha 1, EIF6 and Erbin.

== See also ==
- Cluster of differentiation
- List of target antigens in pemphigoid
