= Coronavirus packaging signal =

Regulartory element in coronaviruses

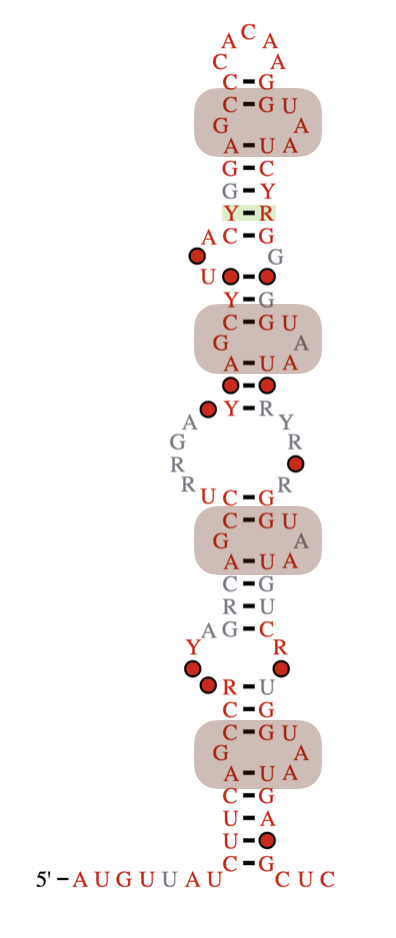
- Predicted secondary structure and sequence conservation of Corona_package

Identifiers
- Symbol: Corona_package
- Rfam: RF00182

Other data
- RNA type: Cis-reg
- Domain(s): Viruses
- SO: SO:0000233
- PDB structures: PDBe

The Coronavirus packaging signal is a conserved cis-regulatory element found in Betacoronavirus (part of the Coronavirus subfamily of viruses). It has an important role in regulating the packaging of the viral genome into the capsid. As part of the viral life cycle, within the infected cell, the viral genome becomes associated with viral proteins and assembles into new infective progeny viruses. This process is called packaging and is vital for viral replication.

The packaging signal is found in the positive-sense single-stranded RNA genome. It interacts with the viral proteins (M and N) and ensures the selective packaging of viral RNA into virions.

This RNA element is conserved in Embecovirus (previously known as lineage A Betacoronavirus), which includes mouse hepatitis virus (MHV), bovine coronavirus (BCoV), and human coronaviruses like HCoV-HKU1 and HCoV-OC43. Notably, this element is absent from the other viral lineages which have evolved separate packaging signals. For example, it is not found in SARS-CoV and SARS-CoV-2 (contrary to previous claims that have been refuted).

The packaging signal has a conserved RNA secondary structure featuring four AGC/GUAAU internal loop motifs. Within the viral genome the packaging signal is located in the nonstructural protein 15 (nsp15) and encodes a polypeptide which is found on the surface of the nsp15 protein. Deleting the packaging signal or introducing mutations that disrupt its secondary structure but not the encoded peptide lead to the loss of packaging specificity. At the same time, relocating the packaging signal to a different part of the genome did not have a negative effect on packaging.

Other RNA families identified in the coronavirus include the coronavirus frameshifting stimulation element, the coronavirus 3′ stem-loop II-like motif (s2m), as well as the 5′- and 3′ UTR pseudoknot.

== See also ==
- Coronavirus 5′ UTR
- Coronavirus 3′ UTR
- Coronavirus 3′ UTR pseudoknot
- Coronavirus 3′ stem-loop II-like motif (s2m)
- Coronavirus frameshifting stimulation element
