= DnaX ribosomal frameshifting element =

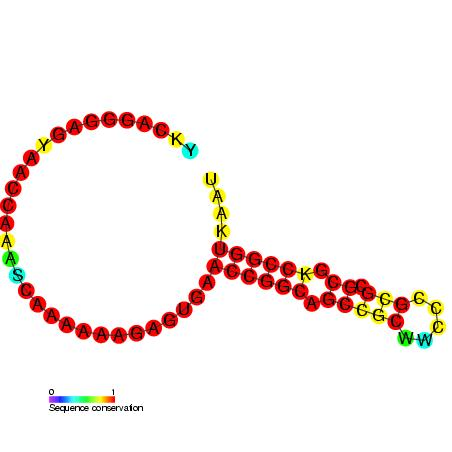
- Predicted secondary structure and sequence conservation of DnaX

Identifiers
- Symbol: DnaX
- Rfam: RF00382

Other data
- RNA type: Cis-reg; frameshift_element
- Domain(s): Bacteria
- SO: SO:0005836
- PDB structures: PDBe

The DnaX ribosomal frameshifting element is a RNA element found in the mRNA of the dnaX gene in E. coli. The dnaX gene has two encoded products, tau and gamma, which are produced in a 1:1 ratio. The gamma protein is synthesised due to programmed frameshifting and is shorter than tau. The two products of the dnaX gene are DNA polymerase III subunits.
