= Plakophilin-4 =

Protein-coding gene in the species Homo sapiens

PKP4

Identifiers
- Aliases: PKP4, p0071, plakophilin 4
- External IDs: OMIM: 604276; MGI: 109281; GeneCards: PKP4

Gene location (Human)
Chr.	Chromosome 2 (human)
Band	2q24.1	Start	158,456,952 bp
Band	2q24.1	End	158,682,879 bp

Gene location (Mouse)
Chr.	Chromosome 2 (mouse)
Band	2|2 C1.1	Start	59,160,850 bp
Band	2|2 C1.1	End	59,355,208 bp
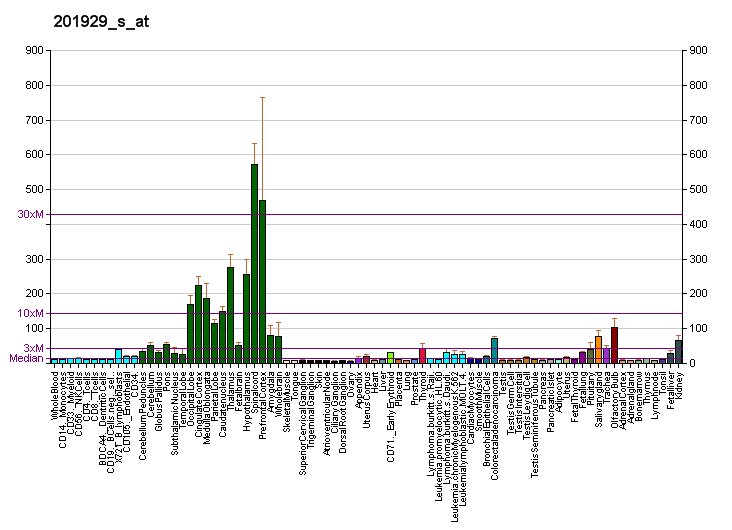

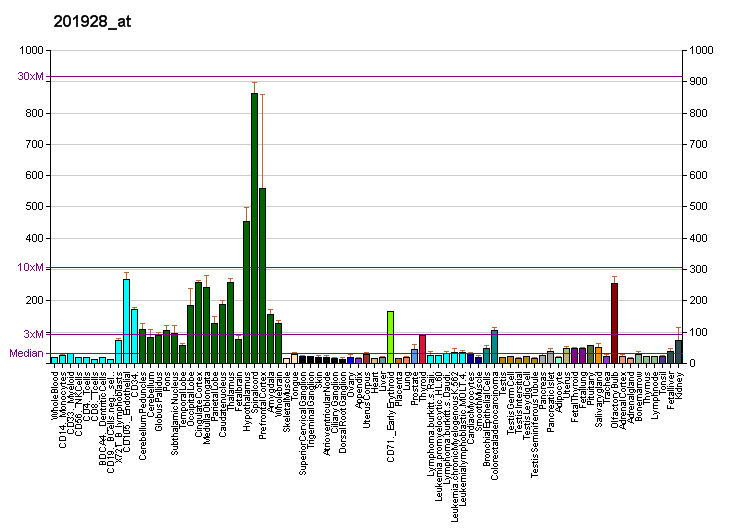

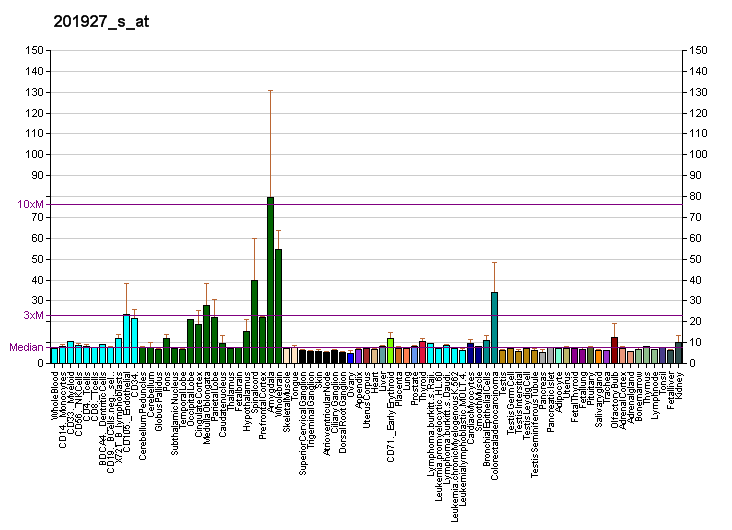
RNA expression pattern
Bgee	Human / Mouse (ortholog); Top expressed in: C1 segment; inferior ganglion of vagus nerve; internal globus pallidus; corpus callosum; pars reticulata; subthalamic nucleus; caput epididymis; amygdala; putamen; middle frontal gyrus / Top expressed in: ciliary body; iris; substantia nigra; Region I of hippocampus proper; tunica media of zone of aorta; deep cerebellar nuclei; ascending aorta; motor neuron; amygdala; submandibular gland; More reference expression data
BioGPS	More reference expression data
Gene ontology
Molecular function	protein binding; cadherin binding
Cellular component	cytoplasm; spindle pole; membrane; postsynaptic density; cell-cell contact zone; cell-cell junction; spindle; desmosome; cell junction; midbody; spindle midzone; perinuclear region of cytoplasm; cytoplasmic side of plasma membrane; mitotic spindle; cytoskeleton; cornified envelope; plasma membrane; nucleus
Biological process	cell-cell signaling; positive regulation of cytokinesis; positive regulation of GTPase activity; regulation of cell adhesion; cell adhesion; cell-cell junction assembly; keratinization; cornification; cell-cell adhesion
Sources:Amigo / QuickGO
Orthologs
Databases	NCBI: entry; OMA: entry
Species	Human	Mouse
Entrez	8502	227937
Ensembl	ENSG00000144283	ENSMUSG00000026991
UniProt	Q99569	Q68FH0
RefSeq (mRNA)	NM_001005476; NM_001304969; NM_001304970; NM_001304971; NM_003628 NM_001377218; NM_001377219; NM_001377220; NM_001377221; NM_001377222; NM_001377223; NM_001377224; NM_001377225; NM_001377226	NM_026361; NM_175464; NM_001362990; NM_001362991; NM_001362992 NM_001362993; NM_001362994; NM_001362995; NM_001362996; NM_001362997; NM_001362998; NM_001362999
RefSeq (protein)	NP_001005476; NP_001291898; NP_001291899; NP_001291900; NP_003619 NP_001364147; NP_001364148; NP_001364149; NP_001364150; NP_001364151; NP_001364152; NP_001364153; NP_001364154; NP_001364155	NP_080637; NP_780673; NP_001349919; NP_001349920; NP_001349921 NP_001349922; NP_001349923; NP_001349924; NP_001349925; NP_001349926; NP_001349927; NP_001349928
Location (UCSC)	Chr 2: 158.46 – 158.68 Mb	Chr 2: 59.16 – 59.36 Mb
PubMed search
- Wikidata
View/Edit Human	View/Edit Mouse

Plakophilin-4 is a protein that in humans is encoded by the PKP4 gene.

== Function ==
Armadillo-like proteins are characterized by a series of armadillo repeats, first defined in the Drosophila 'armadillo' gene product, that are typically 42 to 45 amino acids in length. These proteins can be divided into subfamilies based on their number of repeats, their overall sequence similarity, and the dispersion of the repeats throughout their sequences. Members of the p120(ctn)/plakophilin subfamily of Armadillo-like proteins, including CTNND1, CTNND2, PKP1, PKP2, PKP4, and ARVCF. PKP4 may be a component of desmosomal plaque and other adhesion plaques and is thought to be involved in regulating junctional plaque organization and cadherin function. Multiple transcript variants have been found for this gene, but the full-length nature of only two of them have been described so far. These two variants encode distinct isoforms.

== Interactions ==
PKP4 has been shown to interact with:

- Erbin,
- PDZD2, and
- PSEN1.
