= EIF6 =

Protein-coding gene in the species Homo sapiens

Identifiers
- Aliases: EIF6, CAB, EIF3A, ITGB4BP, b(2)gcn, eIF-6, p27(BBP), p27BBP, eukaryotic translation initiation factor 6
- External IDs: OMIM: 602912; MGI: 1196288; GeneCards: EIF6

Gene location (Human)
Chr.	Chromosome 20 (human)
Band	20q11.22	Start	35,278,907 bp
Band	20q11.22	End	35,284,985 bp

Gene location (Mouse)
Chr.	Chromosome 2 (mouse)
Band	2|2 H1	Start	155,661,752 bp
Band	2|2 H1	End	155,668,845 bp
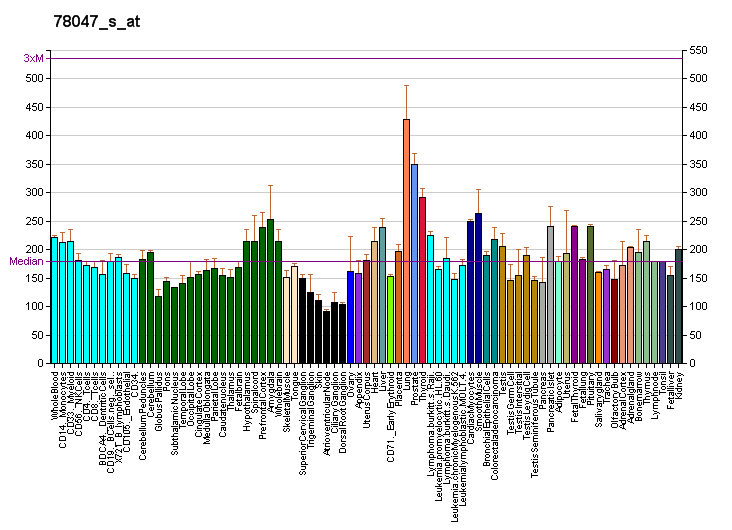

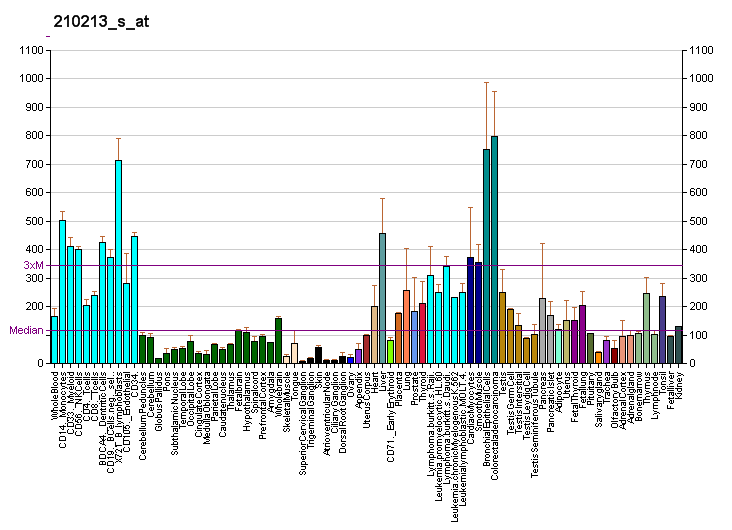
RNA expression pattern
Bgee	Human / Mouse (ortholog); Top expressed in: mucosa of esophagus; mucosa of transverse colon; skin of leg; skin of abdomen; duodenum; rectum; vagina; human kidney; smooth muscle tissue; right lobe of liver / Top expressed in: epiblast; primitive streak; morula; morula; endothelial cell of lymphatic vessel; esophagus; duodenum; jejunum; lip; primary oocyte; More reference expression data
BioGPS	More reference expression data
Gene ontology
Molecular function	ribosome binding; protein binding; translation initiation factor activity; ribosomal large subunit binding
Cellular component	cytoplasm; extracellular exosome; nucleus; nucleoplasm; nucleolus; cytosol; preribosome, large subunit precursor; lamin filament; intermediate filament
Biological process	translational initiation; mature ribosome assembly; protein biosynthesis; ribosome biogenesis; response to insulin; maturation of LSU-rRNA; gene silencing by miRNA; regulation of glycolytic process; assembly of large subunit precursor of preribosome; maturation of 5.8S rRNA; regulation of fatty acid biosynthetic process; regulation of reactive oxygen species metabolic process; positive regulation of translation; regulation of megakaryocyte differentiation; miRNA-mediated gene silencing by inhibition of translation; ribosomal subunit export from nucleus; ribosomal large subunit biogenesis
Sources:Amigo / QuickGO
Orthologs
Databases	NCBI: entry; OMA: entry
Species	Human	Mouse
Entrez	3692	16418
Ensembl	ENSG00000242372	ENSMUSG00000027613
UniProt	P56537	O55135
RefSeq (mRNA)	NM_001267810; NM_002212; NM_181466; NM_181467; NM_181468 NM_181469	NM_010579
RefSeq (protein)	NP_001254739; NP_002203; NP_852131; NP_852133	NP_034709
Location (UCSC)	Chr 20: 35.28 – 35.28 Mb	Chr 2: 155.66 – 155.67 Mb
PubMed search
- Wikidata
View/Edit Human	View/Edit Mouse

Eukaryotic translation initiation factor 6 (EIF6), also known as Integrin beta 4 binding protein (ITGB4BP), is a human gene.

Hemidesmosomes are structures which link the basal lamina to the intermediate filament cytoskeleton. An important functional component of hemidesmosomes is the integrin beta-4 subunit (ITGB4), a protein containing two fibronectin type III domains. The protein encoded by this gene binds to the fibronectin type III domains of ITGB4 and may help link ITGB4 to the intermediate filament cytoskeleton. The encoded protein, which is insoluble and found both in the nucleus and in the cytoplasm, can function as a translation initiation factor and catalyzes the association of the 40S and 60S ribosomal subunits along with eIF5 bound to GTP. Multiple transcript variants encoding several different isoforms have been found for this gene.

EIF6 plays important roles in Eukaryotic 80S ribosome formation, cell growth and gene expression. The 80S ribosome, which can separate into 40S and 60S subunits. EIF6 helps to protect mature 60S subunit and then EIF6 should disassociate with 60S subunit so that it can binds to 40S subunit to form ribosome. Keeping in balance of EIF6 is essential for the body: few EIF6 helps synthesis of normal ribosome, while large amount of EIF6 inhibited 60S subunits bind to 40S subunits.

== Function ==
EIF6 exists both in nucleolus and cytoplasm. In the eukaryotic nucleolus, a 90S pre-ribosomal complex separate to a 60S pre-ribosomal complex and a 40S pre-ribosomal complex, which are involved in synthesis of mature ribosome. EIF6 is indispensable in 60S subunit biogenesis and deletion of EIF6 has lethal effect. The partial deletion of eIF6 results in decreasing of free 60S ribosomal subunit, which means it knocks the 40S/60S subunit ratio off balance, and limiting the speed of protein synthesis. 60S pre-ribosomal complex associated with eIF6 shuttle from nucleolus to cytoplasm and then eIF6 disassociated with pre-60S so that 60S subunit can binds to 40S subunit and continues to subsequent progress. EIF6 can act as a rate-limiting translational initiation factor, and its expression levels influence the translational rate. Few of eIF6 will small accelerate protein translation, while large of eIF6 will block translational process by inhibiting production of ribosome. The activity of eIF6 also cause glycolysis and fatty acid synthesis by mRNAs' translational controlling.

== Structure ==
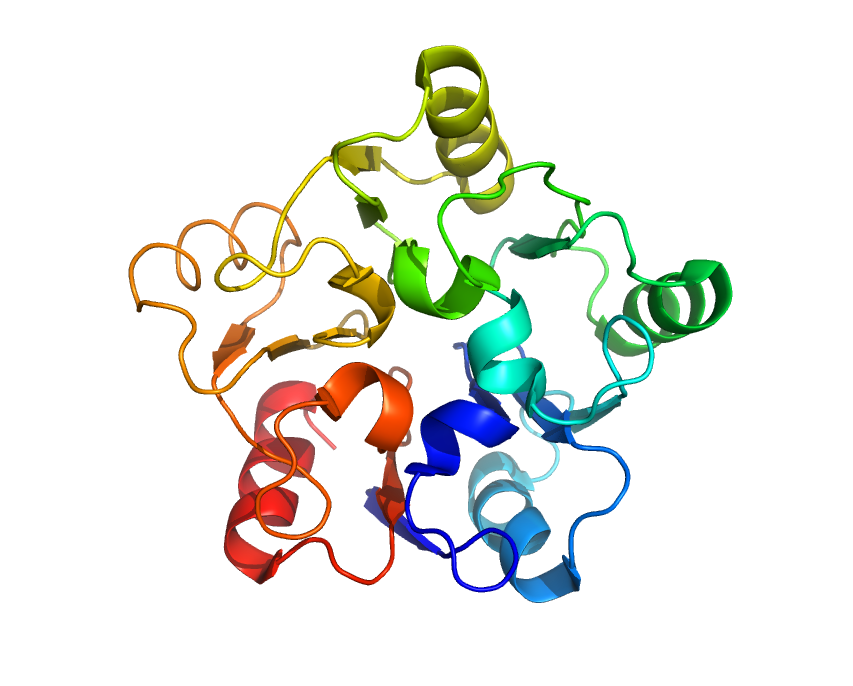
An x-ray crystallography-based model of eIF6 structure from S. cerevisiae

eIF6 is 245 amino acids long.

== Expression ==
EIF6 has different level of expression in different tissue and cell. EIF6 has high level of expression in stem cells and cycling cells, while it doesn't in postmitotic cells; high level in brain and epithelia, while low level in muscle.

== Interactions ==
EIF6 has been shown to interact with FHL2, ITGB4 and GNB2L1.

EIF6 plays important roles in 80S ribosome formation, cell growth and gene expression.

== Evolution ==
eIF6 is present in both yeast and humans, and its amino acid sequence is 77% identical between the two. No duplications of eIF6, or even conserved motifs within the protein are known.

== History ==
eIF6 activity was first described by work in the early 1980s from Linda L. Spremulli's and Umadas Maitra's laboratories. The gene was eventually cloned by Maitra's and Gene Carlo Marchisio's groups, both publishing their work in 1997.

== See also ==
- Eukaryotic initiation factor
- Eukaryotic large ribosomal subunit (60S)
