= Coronavirus 3′ stem-loop II-like motif (s2m) =

Genetic motif present in some viruses

- Predicted secondary structure and sequence conservation of s2m

Identifiers
- Symbol: s2m
- Rfam: RF00164

Other data
- RNA type: Cis-reg
- Domain(s): Eukaryota; Viruses
- SO: SO:0000233
- PDB structures: PDBe

The Coronavirus 3′ stem-loop II-like motif (also known as s2m) is a secondary structure motif identified in the 3′ untranslated region (3′UTR) of astrovirus, coronavirus and equine rhinovirus genomes. Its function is unknown, but various viral 3′ UTR regions have been found to play roles in viral replication and packaging.

This motif appears to be conserved in both nucleotide sequence and secondary structure folding indicating a strong evolutionary selection for its conservation. The presence of this conserved motif in different viral families is suggested to be the result of at least two separate recombination events. To date s2m has been described in four families of positive sense single-stranded RNA viruses; Astroviridae, Caliciviridae, Picornaviridae and Coronaviridae. The viruses that contain s2m can infect a wide range of higher vertebrates, including birds, bats, horses, dogs and humans, and display different tissue tropisms. There seems to be a xenologue of s2m in a number of only distantly related insect species.

Other RNA families identified in the coronavirus include the coronavirus frameshifting stimulation element, the coronavirus packaging signal and the coronavirus 3′ UTR pseudoknot.

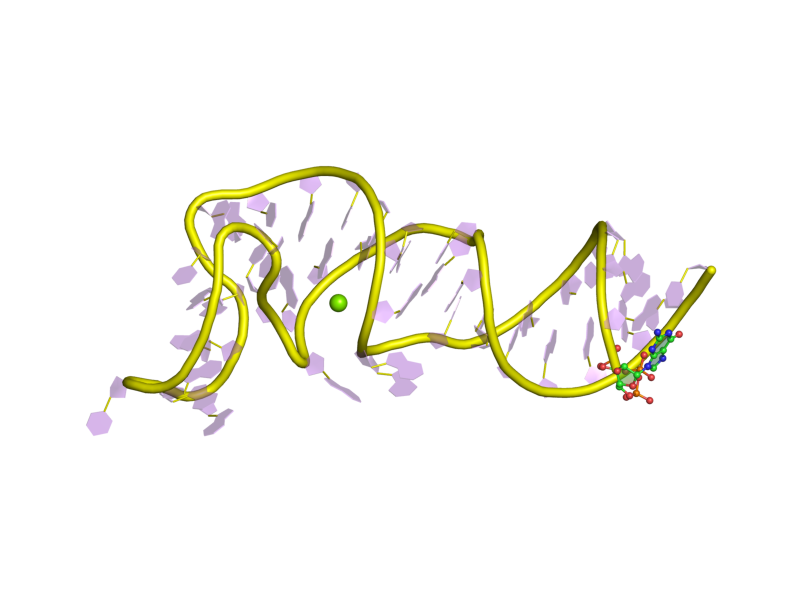
A representation of the 3D structure of the s2m motif.

== Biological significance ==
Functionally during host invasion by viral RNA, it appears that s2m first binds one or more proteins as a mechanism for the viral RNA to substitute host protein synthesis. This has also been seen in s2m RNA macromolecular substitution of ribosomal RNA folds. The s2m RNA element are also effective targets for the design of anti-viral drugs and antisense oligonucleotides.

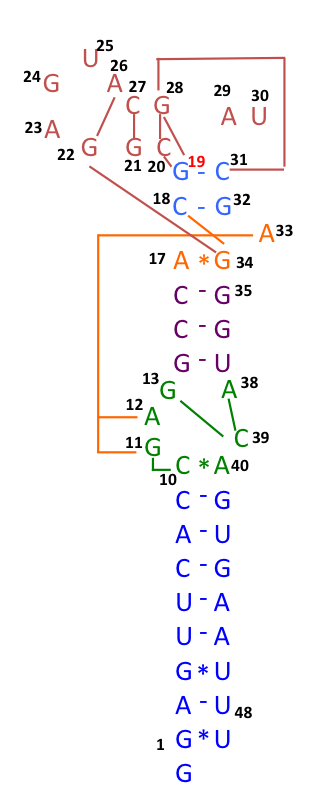
Schematic representation of the s2m RNA secondary structure, with tertiary structural interactions indicated as long range contacts.

Potential interacting human microRNA targets of SARS-CoV-2 that share similarity with those of influenza A virus H1N1 was identified as therapeutic targets.

== Different structure between SARS-CoV-1 and SARS-CoV-2 s2m ==
The overall X-ray (2.7-Å) crystal structure of the s2m SARS-CoV-1 RNA and is different from the SARS-CoV-2 s2m secondary structure determined by NMR. Long-distance interactions between the 5′ UTR and s2m in SARS-CoV-2 genomic RNA have been suggested.

== Mutations of SARS-CoV-2 s2m: recombination hotspots rather than a conserved RNA motif ==
During COVID-19 pandemic in 2020, many genomic sequences of Australian SARS‐CoV‐2 isolates have deletions or mutations (29742G>A or 29742G>U; "G19A" or "G19U") in the s2m, suggesting that RNA recombination may have occurred in this RNA element. 29742G("G19"), 29744G("G21"), and 29751G("G28") were predicted as recombination hotspots. 29742G>U mutation was also linked to travellers returning from Iran to Australia and New Zealand. In three patients in Diamond Princess cruise, two mutations, 29736G > T and 29751G > T ("G13" and "G28") were found in s2m of SARS-CoV-2, as "G28" was predicted as recombination hotspots in Australian SARS-CoV-2 mutants. This result suggests that s2m of SARS-CoV-2 is RNA recombination/mutation hotspot rather than a conserved RNA motif found in other coronaviruses.

Molecular dynamics simulations shows that both S2M variants, 29734G>C (G11C) and 29742G>U (G19U), of SARS-CoV-2 change RNA structure stability, raising questions as to the functional relevance of s2m in SARS-CoV-2 replication.

== See also ==
- Coronavirus 5′ UTR
- Coronavirus 3′ UTR
- Coronavirus 3′ UTR pseudoknot
- Coronavirus frameshifting stimulation element
- Coronavirus packaging signal
