= Vectorial synthesis =

Type of synthesis of exported proteins

Vectorial synthesis is synthesis of exported proteins by ribosomes in which the ribosome-nascent chain complex is bound directly to the endoplasmic reticulum (ER) and the nascent peptide chain moves through the ER membrane as it emerges from the ribosome.
