= PDZD2 =

Protein-coding gene in the species Homo sapiens

Identifiers
- Aliases: PDZD2, AIPC, PAPIN, PDZK3, PIN1, PDZ domain containing 2
- External IDs: OMIM: 610697; MGI: 1922394; GeneCards: PDZD2

Gene location (Human)
| Chr. | Chromosome 5 (human) |
| Band | 5p13.3 | Start | 31,639,131 bp |
| Band | 5p13.3 | End | 32,110,932 bp |

Gene location (Mouse)
| Chr. | Chromosome 15 (mouse) |
| Band | 15|15 A1 | Start | 12,359,797 bp |
| Band | 15|15 A1 | End | 12,740,010 bp |
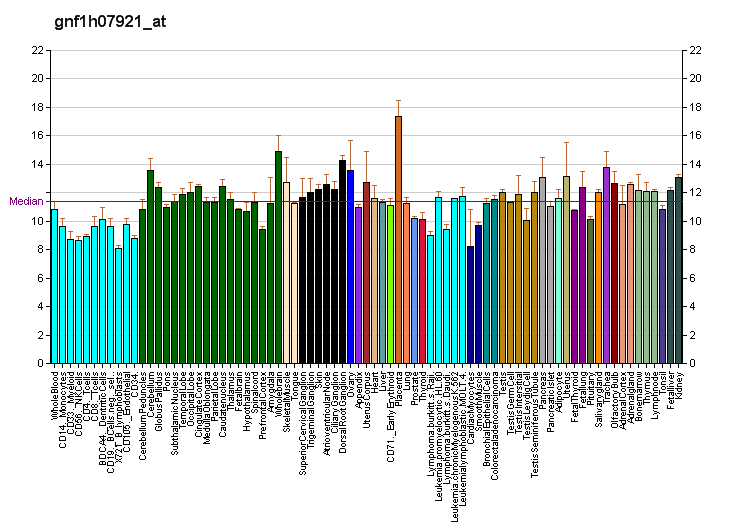

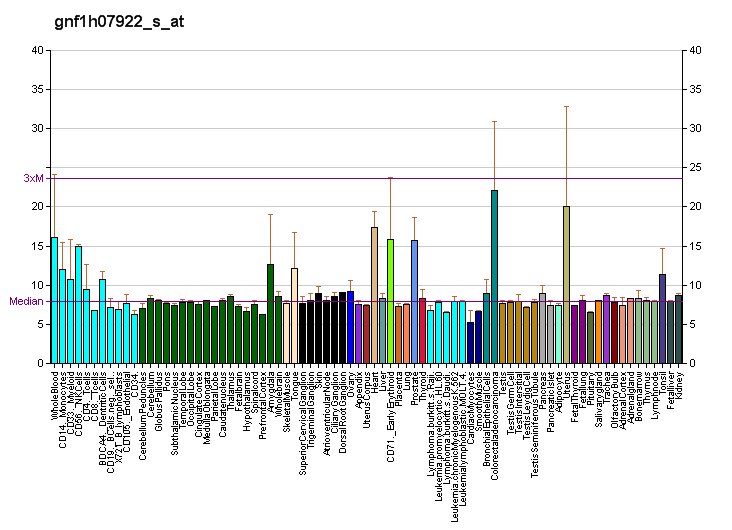

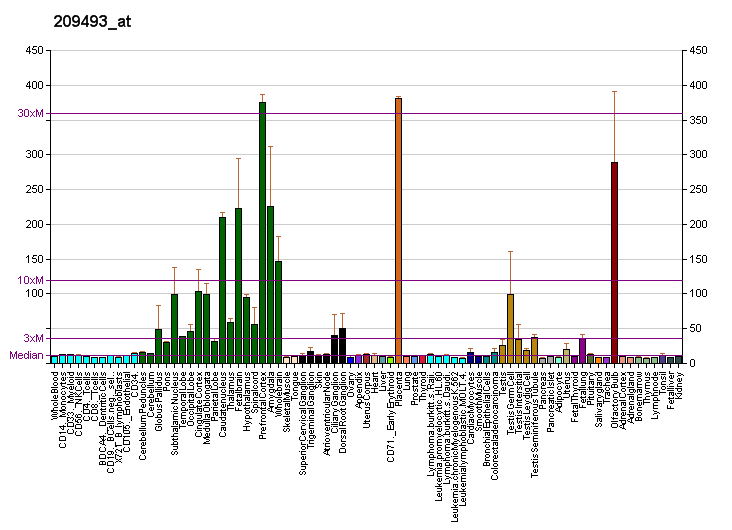
RNA expression pattern
| Bgee | Human / Mouse (ortholog); Top expressed in: trigeminal ganglion; spinal ganglia; skin of thigh; postcentral gyrus; external globus pallidus; Epithelium of choroid plexus; skin of hip; buccal mucosa cell; placenta; sural nerve / Top expressed in: olfactory tubercle; right lung; right lung lobe; left lung lobe; primary oocyte; zygote; epithelium of small intestine; skin of back; skin of external ear; ascending aorta; More reference expression data |
| BioGPS | More reference expression data |
Orthologs
| Databases | NCBI: entry; OMA: entry |
| Species | Human | Mouse |
| Entrez | 23037 | 68070 |
| Ensembl | ENSG00000133401 | ENSMUSG00000022197 |
| UniProt | O15018 | n/a |
| RefSeq (mRNA) | NM_015022; NM_178140 | NM_001081064 |
| RefSeq (protein) | NP_835260 | n/a |
| Location (UCSC) | Chr 5: 31.64 – 32.11 Mb | Chr 15: 12.36 – 12.74 Mb |
| PubMed search |
- Wikidata
| View/Edit Human | View/Edit Mouse |

PDZ domain-containing protein 2 is a protein that in humans is encoded by the PDZD2 gene.

== Function ==
Proteins containing PDZ domains have been shown frequently to bind the C-termini of transmembrane receptors or ion channels. They have also been shown to bind to other PDZ domain proteins and could possibly be involved in intracellular signalling. The protein encoded by this gene contains six PDZ domains and shares sequence similarity with pro-interleukin-16 (pro-IL-16). Like pro-IL-16, the encoded protein localizes to the endoplasmic reticulum and is thought to be cleaved by a caspase to produce a secreted peptide containing two PDZ domains. In addition, this gene is upregulated in primary prostate tumors and may be involved in the early stages of prostate tumorigenesis.

== Interactions ==
PDZD2 has been shown to interact with PKP4.
