= Alternative ribosome-rescue factor A =

Protein

Identifiers
- Symbol: ?
- Pfam: PF03889
- InterPro: IPR005589
Available protein structures:
- Pfam: structures / ECOD
- PDB: RCSB PDB; PDBe; PDBj
- PDBsum: structure summary

Alternative ribosome-rescue factor A

Identifiers
- Organism: E. coli
- Symbol: ArfA
- UniProt: P36675
Search for
- Structures: Swiss-model
- Domains: InterPro

Alternative ribosome-rescue factor A (ArfA, YhdL) also known as peptidyl-tRNA hydrolase, is a protein that plays a role in rescuing of stalled ribosomes. It recruits RF2.

== See also ==
- ArfB - Alternative ribosome-rescue factor B
