= OAZ2 =

Enzyme

Identifiers
- Aliases: OAZ2, AZ2, ornithine decarboxylase antizyme 2
- External IDs: OMIM: 604152; MGI: 109492; HomoloGene: 31094; GeneCards: OAZ2; OMA:OAZ2 - orthologs

Gene location (Human)
Chr.	Chromosome 15 (human)
Band	15q22.31	Start	64,687,573 bp
Band	15q22.31	End	64,703,281 bp

Gene location (Mouse)
Chr.	Chromosome 9 (mouse)
Band	9|9 C	Start	65,575,283 bp
Band	9|9 C	End	65,597,582 bp
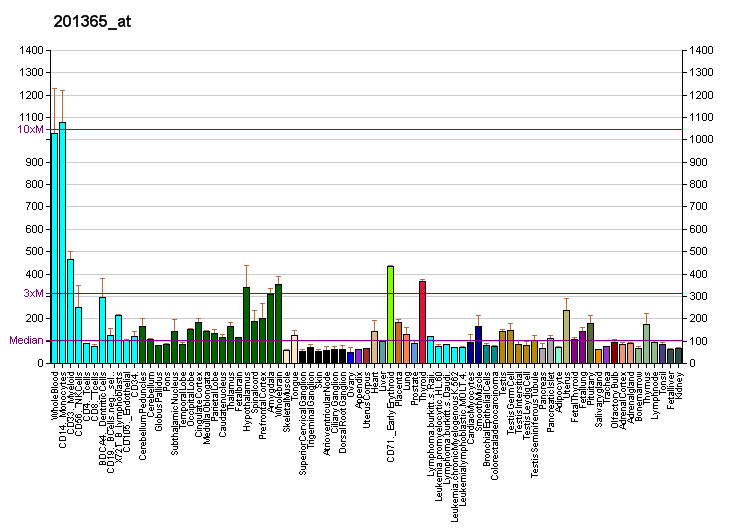

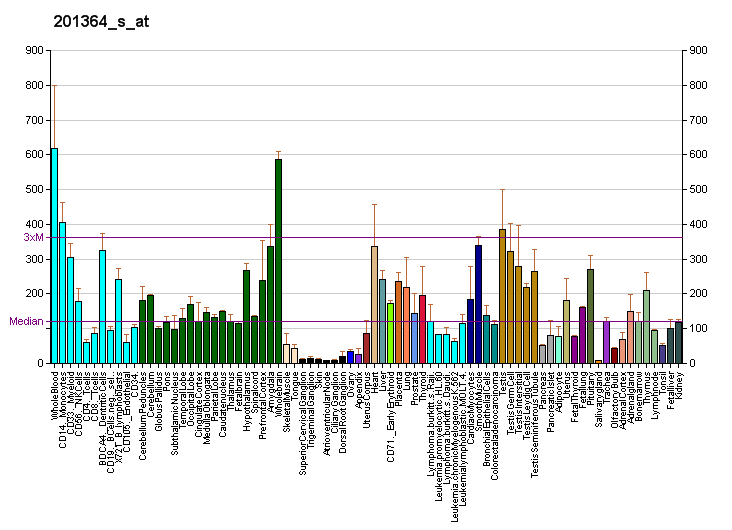
RNA expression pattern
Bgee	Human / Mouse (ortholog); Top expressed in: left testis; right testis; monocyte; C1 segment; prefrontal cortex; amygdala; nucleus accumbens; gastrocnemius muscle; cingulate gyrus; right frontal lobe / Top expressed in: lung; muscle of thigh; quadriceps femoris muscle; skeletal muscle tissue; neural tube; dentate gyrus of hippocampal formation granule cell; mesencephalon; hypothalamus; heart; superior frontal gyrus; More reference expression data
BioGPS	More reference expression data
Gene ontology
Molecular function	ornithine decarboxylase inhibitor activity; protein binding
Cellular component	cytosol; nucleus; cytoplasm
Biological process	positive regulation of intracellular protein transport; polyamine biosynthetic process; polyamine metabolic process; negative regulation of polyamine transmembrane transport; negative regulation of catalytic activity; regulation of cellular amino acid metabolic process; positive regulation of protein catabolic process
Sources:Amigo / QuickGO
Orthologs
Species	Human	Mouse
Entrez	4947	18247
Ensembl	ENSG00000180304	ENSMUSG00000040652
UniProt	O95190	O08608
RefSeq (mRNA)	NM_002537; NM_001301302	NM_001301307; NM_010952
RefSeq (protein)	NP_001288231; NP_002528	NP_001288236; NP_035082
Location (UCSC)	Chr 15: 64.69 – 64.7 Mb	Chr 9: 65.58 – 65.6 Mb
PubMed search
- Wikidata
View/Edit Human	View/Edit Mouse

Ornithine decarboxylase antizyme 2 is an enzyme that in humans is encoded by the OAZ2 gene.

Ornithine decarboxylase catalyzes the conversion of ornithine to putrescine in the first and apparently rate-limiting step in polyamine biosynthesis. The ornithine decarboxylase antizymes play a role in the regulation of polyamine synthesis by binding to and inhibiting ornithine decarboxylase. Antizyme expression is auto-regulated by polyamine-enhanced translational frameshifting. The antizyme encoded by this gene inhibits ornithine decarboxylase but does not accelerate its degradation.
