= Alternative ribosome-rescue factor B =

Peptidyl-tRNA hydrolase ArfB

Identifiers
- Organism: E. coli
- Symbol: ArfB
- UniProt: P40711
Search for
- Structures: Swiss-model
- Domains: InterPro

Alternative ribosome-rescue factor B (ArfB, YaeJ) also known as peptidyl-tRNA hydrolase, is a protein that plays a role in rescuing of stalled ribosomes. It works like a GGQ-release factor itself, releasing the peptide from tRNA. At the same time, it fits into the mRNA tunnel to remove the mRNA.

This gene is also found in eukaryotic organelles as MRPL58 (ICT1). The similarity is high enough to be interchangeable. Its role has expanded to that of a codon-independent release factor, although it likely still functions in ribosomal rescue.

== See also ==
- ArfA - Alternative ribosome-rescue factor A
