= Coronavirus 3′ UTR pseudoknot =

- Predicted secondary structure and sequence conservation of Corona_pk3

Identifiers
- Symbol: Corona_pk3
- Rfam: RF00165

Other data
- RNA type: Cis-reg
- Domain(s): Viruses
- SO: SO:0000205
- PDB structures: PDBe

The Coronavirus 3′ UTR pseudoknot is an RNA structure found in the coronavirus genome. Coronaviruses contain 30 kb single-stranded positive-sense RNA genomes. The 3′ UTR region of these coronavirus genomes contains a conserved ~55 nucleotide pseudoknot structure which is necessary for viral genome replication. The mechanism of cis-regulation is unclear, but this element is postulated to function in the plus-strand.

Other RNA families identified in the coronavirus include the coronavirus frameshifting stimulation element, the coronavirus 3′ stem-loop II-like motif (s2m) and the coronavirus packaging signal.
