= A-site =

The A-site (A for aminoacyl) of a ribosome is a binding site for charged t-RNA molecules during protein synthesis. One of three such binding sites, the A-site is the first location the t-RNA binds during the protein synthesis process, the other two sites being P-site (peptidyl) and E-site (exit).
