= OAZ1 =

Protein-coding gene in humans

Available structures
PDB	Ortholog search: PDBe RCSB
PDB	List of PDB id codes 4ZGY, 4ZGZ, 5BWA

Identifiers
- Aliases: OAZ1, AZI, OAZ, ornithine decarboxylase antizyme 1, AZ1
- External IDs: OMIM: 601579; MGI: 109433; HomoloGene: 7455; GeneCards: OAZ1; OMA:OAZ1 - orthologs

Gene location (Human)
Chr.	Chromosome 19 (human)
Band	19p13.3	Start	2,269,509 bp
Band	19p13.3	End	2,273,490 bp

Gene location (Mouse)
Chr.	Chromosome 10 (mouse)
Band	10 C1|10 39.72 cM	Start	80,662,490 bp
Band	10 C1|10 39.72 cM	End	80,665,124 bp
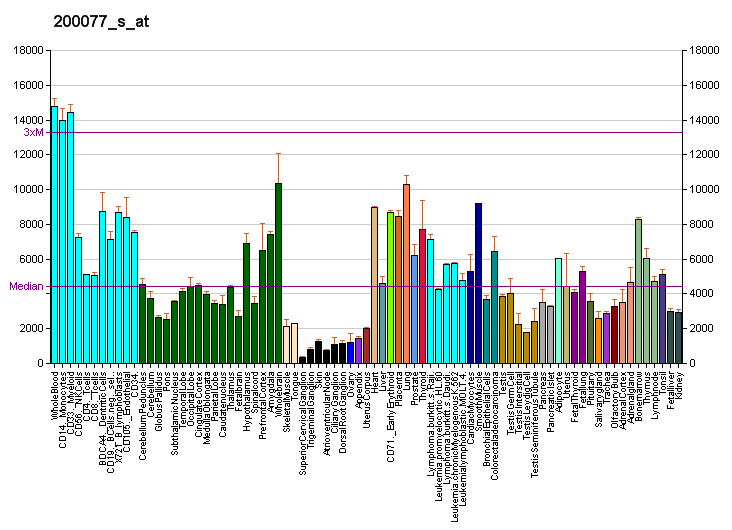

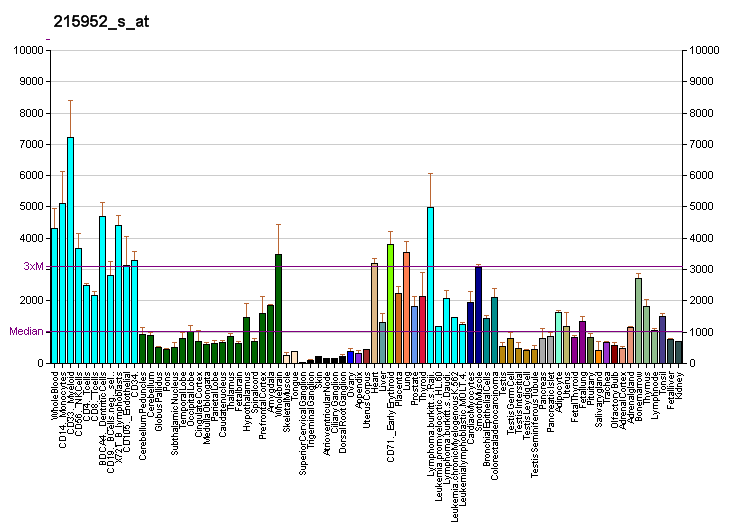
RNA expression pattern
Bgee	Human / Mouse (ortholog); Top expressed in: pons; blood; pylorus; pars compacta; renal medulla; superior vestibular nucleus; monocyte; cardia; postcentral gyrus; parotid gland / Top expressed in: bone marrow; neural layer of retina; secondary oocyte; proximal tubule; zygote; right kidney; mesencephalon; quadriceps femoris muscle; neural tube; thymus; More reference expression data
BioGPS	More reference expression data
Gene ontology
Molecular function	ornithine decarboxylase inhibitor activity; protein binding
Cellular component	cytosol; nucleus; cytoplasm
Biological process	positive regulation of intracellular protein transport; polyamine biosynthetic process; negative regulation of polyamine transmembrane transport; negative regulation of catalytic activity; regulation of cellular amino acid metabolic process; positive regulation of protein catabolic process; polyamine metabolic process
Sources:Amigo / QuickGO
Orthologs
Species	Human	Mouse
Entrez	4946	18245
Ensembl	ENSG00000104904	ENSMUSG00000035242
UniProt	P54368	P54369
RefSeq (mRNA)	NM_004152; NM_001301020	NM_001301034; NM_008753
RefSeq (protein)	NP_001287949; NP_004143	NP_001287963; NP_032779
Location (UCSC)	Chr 19: 2.27 – 2.27 Mb	Chr 10: 80.66 – 80.67 Mb
PubMed search
- Wikidata
View/Edit Human	View/Edit Mouse

Ornithine decarboxylase antizyme is an enzyme that in humans is encoded by the OAZ1 gene.

Ornithine decarboxylase catalyzes the conversion of ornithine to putrescine in the first and apparently rate-limiting step in polyamine biosynthesis. The ornithine decarboxylase antizymes play a role in the regulation of polyamine synthesis by binding to and inhibiting ornithine decarboxylase. Antizyme expression is auto-regulated by polyamine-enhanced translational frameshifting. The antizyme encoded by this gene inhibits ornithine decarboxylase and accelerates its degradation.
