= E-site =

The E-site is the third and final binding site for t-RNA in the ribosome during translation, a part of protein synthesis. The "E" stands for exit, and is accompanied by the P-site (for peptidyl) which is the second binding site, and the A-site (aminoacyl), which is the first binding site. It is involved in cellular processes.
