= P-site =

Ribosome binding site

The P-site (for peptidyl) is the second binding site for tRNA in the ribosome. The other two sites are the A-site (aminoacyl), which is the first binding site in the ribosome, and the E-site (exit), the third. During protein translation, the P-site holds the tRNA which is linked to the growing polypeptide chain. When a stop codon is reached, the peptidyl-tRNA bond of the tRNA located in the P-site is cleaved releasing the newly synthesized protein. During the translocation step of the elongation phase, the mRNA is advanced by one codon, coupled to movement of the tRNAs from the ribosomal A to P and P to E sites, catalyzed by elongation factor EF-G.

== Overview ==
The ribosomal P-site plays a vital role in all phases of translation. Initiation involves recognition of the start codon (AUG) by initiator tRNA in the P-site, elongation involves passage of many elongator tRNAs through the P site, termination involves hydrolysis of the mature polypeptide from tRNA bound to the P-site, and ribosome recycling involves release of deacylated tRNA. Binding a tRNA to the P-site in the presence of mRNA establishes codon-anticodon interaction, and this interaction is important for small subunit ribosome (30S) contacts to the tRNA.

The classical two-state model proposes that the ribosome contains two binding sites for tRNA, P-site and A-site. The A-site binds to incoming aminoacyl-tRNA which has the anti-codon for the corresponding codon in the mRNA presented in the A-site. After peptide formation between the C-terminal carbonyl group of the growing polypeptide chain (attached to a P-site bound tRNA) and the amino group of the aminoacyl-tRNA (A-site bound), the polypeptide chain is then attached to the tRNA in the A-site. The deacylated tRNA remains in the P-site and is released once the peptidyl-tRNA is transferred to the P-site. How is the translocation of the peptidyl-tRNA from the A-site to the P-site achieved to complete the cycle? It was proposed that this is done in two steps by the movement of the two ribosomal subunits with respect to each other, with the formation of an intermediate hybrid structure: the A-site of one subunit with the P-site of the other subunit. This is analogous to moving a large object: you move one end first, then the other.

Chemical modification experiments provided evidence of this hybrid model, in which tRNAs can sample a hybrid state of binding during the elongation phase (pre-translocation step). In these hybrid states of binding, acceptor and anti-codon ends of tRNA are in different sites (A, P and E). Using chemical probing methods, a set of phylogenetically conserved bases in ribosomal RNA where the tRNA binds has been examined, and is suggested to be directly involved in the binding of tRNA to the prokaryotic ribosome. Correlation of such site-specific protected bases in rRNA and occupancy of the A, P and E sites has allowed diagnostic assays of these bases to study the location of tRNA in any given state of the translational cycle. Authors proposed a hybrid model in which higher affinity of the deactivated tRNA and peptide tRNA for the E and P sites of the 50S subunit, thermodynamically favours P/P to P/E and A/A to A/P transitions, which were further demonstrated through cryo-EM experiments. Also, single molecule FRET studies have detected fluctuations in the positions of tRNAs, leading to the conclusion that the classical (A/A-P/P) and hybrid states (A/P-P/E) of the tRNAs are certainly in dynamic equilibrium.

Prior to peptide bond formation, an aminoacyl-tRNA is bound in the A-site, a peptidyl-tRNA is bound in the P-site, and a deacylated tRNA (ready to exit from the ribosome) is bound to the E-site. Translation moves the tRNA from the A-site through the P- and E-sites, with the exception of the initiator tRNA, which binds directly to the P-site. Recent experiments have reported that protein translation can also initiate from the A-site. Using toeprinting assay, it has been shown that protein synthesis initiates from the A-site of the ribosome (eukaryotic) in the cricket paralysis virus (CrPV). IGR-IRES (intragenic regions-internal ribosome entry sites) can assemble 80S ribosomes from 40S and 60S ribosomal subunits in the absence of eIF2, Met-tRNAi, or GTP hydrolysis and without a coding triplet in the ribosomal P-site. Authors also showed IGR-IRES can direct translation of a protein whose N-terminal residue is not methionine.

== Structure ==
The complete three-dimensional structure of the T. thermophilus 70S ribosome was determined using X-ray crystallography, containing mRNA and tRNAs bound to the P and E sites at 5.5 Å resolution and to the A site at 7 Å resolution. Authors found that all three tRNA binding sites (A, P, and E) of the ribosome contact all three respective tRNAs at universally conserved parts of their structures. This allows the ribosome to bind different tRNA species in precisely the same way. The translocation step of protein synthesis requires movements of 20 Å or more by the tRNAs, as they move from the A to P to E sites

== tRNA-targeting antibiotics ==
Oxazolidines (e.g. linezolid) prevent the binding of the initiator tRNA at the P-site. Oxazolidines have been demonstrated to pleiotropically affect initiator-tRNA binding, EF-P (elongation factor P)-stimulated synthesis of peptide bonds, and EF-G-mediated translocation of initiator-tRNA into the P-site.

Macrolide, lincosamide and streptogramin classes of antibiotics prevent peptide bond formation and/or the translocation of tRNA from the A-site to the P-site on the ribosome that eventually leads to interference with the elongation step and thus the inhibition of protein translation.
