= International Society for Nanoscale Science, Computation, and Engineering =

Scientific society

The International Society for Nanoscale Science, Computation, and Engineering (ISNSCE, pronounced like "essence") is a scientific society specializing in nanotechnology and DNA computing. It was started in 2004 by Nadrian Seeman, founder of the field of DNA nanotechnology. According to the society, its purpose is "to promote the study of the control of the arrangement of the atoms in matter, examine the principles that lead to such control, to develop tools and methods to increase such control, and to investigate the use of these principles for molecular computation, and for engineering on the finest possible scales."

ISNSCE sponsors two academic conferences each year: the first is Foundations of Nanoscience (FNANO), and the second is the International Conference on DNA Computing and Molecular Computation (DNA Computing). The FNANO conference has been held in Snowbird, Utah each year in April since 2004, and focuses on molecular self-assembly of nanoscale materials and devices. DNA Computing focuses on biomolecular computing and DNA nanotechnology, and has been held annually since 1995. The proceedings of DNA Computing were published as part of the Lecture Notes in Computer Science book series until 2019, and since 2020 have been published as part of the Leibniz International Proceedings in Informatics.

== Awards ==
ISNSCE sponsors two awards annually. The ISNSCE Nanoscience Prize recognizes research in any area of nanoscience, and has been presented at FNANO each year since 2007. The Tulip Award in DNA Computing is specific to the fields of biomolecular computing and molecular programming, and has been presented at the DNA Computing conference since 2000. ISNSCE also sponsors two student awards for papers presented at the DNA Computing conference each year.

The Tulip Award was first given at the sixth DNA Computing conference, in Leiden, the Netherlands, whose botanical garden is known as the birthplace of the tulip culture in the Netherlands.

In April 2015, ISNCSE established the Robert Dirks Molecular Programming Prize to recognize early-career scientists for molecular programming research. The award was established in memory of Dirks, who was one of the six fatalities of the February 2015 Valhalla train crash.

=== ISNSCE Nanoscience Prize ===
The following are recipients of the ISNSCE Nanoscience Prize:

Year	Awardee	Institution
2008	George M. Whitesides	Harvard University
2009	Paul Alivisatos	University of California, Berkeley
2010	James Fraser Stoddart	Northwestern University
2011	Nadrian Seeman	New York University
2012	Cees Dekker	Delft University of Technology
2013	Bartosz Grzybowski	Northwestern University
2014	Makoto Fujita	University of Tokyo
2015	Paul Rothemund	California Institute of Technology
2016	Christoph Gerber	University of Basel
2017	Angela Belcher	Massachusetts Institute of Technology
2019	David Leigh	University of Manchester
2020	Samuel I. Stupp	Northwestern University

=== Tulip Award in DNA Computing ===
The following are recipients of the Tulip Award in DNA Computing:

Year	Awardee	Institution	Rationale
2000	Erik Winfree	California Institute of Technology	
2001	Laura Landweber	Princeton University	
2002	Tom Head	Binghamton University	
2003	Anne Condon	University of British Columbia	
2004	Nadrian C. Seeman	New York University	
2005	John H. Reif	Duke University	
2006	Paul Rothemund	California Institute of Technology	
2007	Natasha Jonoska	University of South Florida	"for her work in applications of automata and graph theory to DNA assembly"
2008	Masami Hagiya	University of Tokyo	"for his important contributions to biomolecular computation"
2009	Bernard Yurke	Boise State University	"for his important contributions to DNA nanotechnology"
2010	Milan Stojanovic	Columbia University	"for his important achievements in molecular computing using aptamers and ribozymes"
2011	Andrew Turberfield	University of Oxford	"for his continuous, often pioneering, research contributions (from the early days of DNA computing)"
2012	Luca Cardelli	Microsoft Research	"for his research contributions to theory and software for programming biomolecular systems... [which] has provided insight into the computational nature of biomolecular processes, in particular those of strand displacement devices, and has facilitated the design of new software tools."
2013	Hao Yan	Arizona State University	
2013	Yan Liu	Arizona State University	
2014	David Soloveichik	University of California, San Francisco	
2015	Lila Kari	University of Western Ontario	
2016	Friedrich Simmel	Technical University of Munich	"for his contributions in advancing DNA-based networks and self-organization of DNA-based systems"
2017	Peng Yin	Harvard University	"for his pioneering work developing the foundations and applications of programmable nucleic acid nanotechnology"
2018	William Shih	Harvard University	"for his innovative self-assembling DNA nanostructures and tools for advancing molecular biophysics and therapeutics"
2019	Lulu Qian	California Institute of Technology	"for her elegant and beautiful approaches to programmable DNA origami tile self-assembly, and for laying the foundations for scalable DNA neural networks"
2020	Niles Pierce	California Institute of Technology	

== See also ==
- Kavli Prize in Nanoscience
- Foresight Institute Feynman Prize in Nanotechnology
- IEEE Pioneer Award in Nanotechnology
