= DNA origami =

Folding of DNA to create two- and three-dimensional shapes at the nanoscale

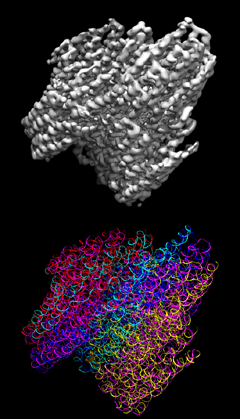
DNA origami object from viral DNA visualized by electron tomography. The map is at the top and atomic model of the DNA colored below. (Deposited in EMDB EMD-2210)

DNA origami is the nanoscale folding of DNA to create arbitrary two- and three-dimensional shapes at the nanoscale. The specificity of the interactions between complementary base pairs makes DNA a useful construction material, through the design of its base sequences. DNA is a well-understood material that is suitable for creating scaffolds that hold other molecules in place or to create structures all on its own.

DNA origami was the cover story of Nature on March 16, 2006. Since then, DNA origami has progressed past an art form and has found a number of applications from drug delivery systems to uses as circuitry in plasmonic devices; however, most commercial applications remain in a concept or testing phase.

== Overview ==
The idea of using DNA as a construction material was first introduced in the early 1980s by Nadrian Seeman. The method of DNA origami was developed by Paul Rothemund at the California Institute of Technology. In contrast to common top-down fabrication methods such as 3D printing or lithography which involve depositing or removing material through a tool, DNA Nanotechnology, as well as DNA origami as a subset, is a bottom-up fabrication method. By rationally designing the constituent subunits of the DNA polymer, DNA can self-assemble into a variety of shapes. The process of constructing DNA origami involves the folding of a long single strand of viral DNA (typically the 7,249 bp genomic DNA of M13 bacteriophage) aided by multiple smaller "staple" strands. These shorter strands bind the longer in various places, resulting in the formation of a pre-defined two- or three-dimensional shape. Examples include a smiley face and a coarse map of China and the Americas, along with many three-dimensional structures such as cubes.

There are several DNA properties that make the molecule an ideal building material for DNA origami. DNA strands have a natural tendency to bind to their complementary sequences through Watson–Crick base pairing. This allows staple strands to locate the position on the scaffold strand without any external manipulation, leading to self-assembly of the desired structure.

The specific sequence of bases in DNA gives the material an element of programmability by determining its binding behavior. Carefully designing the sequences of the staple strands enables scientists to precisely direct the scaffold strand's folding into a predetermined shape with high precision.

On a chemical level, the hydrogen bonds that exist between the complementary base pairs provide strength and stability to the folded DNA origami structures. Additionally, DNA is a relatively stable molecule, offering resilience in physiological conditions.

One of the advantages of using a DNA origami nanostructure over an otherwise classified DNA nanostructure is the ease of defining finite structures. In the design of some other DNA nanostructures, it can be impractical to design an extremely large number of individualized strands if the entire structure is composed of smaller strands. One method of bypassing the need for a huge number of different strands is to use repeating units, which comes with the disadvantage of a distribution of sizes and sometimes shapes. DNA Origami, however, forms discrete structures.

Applications for DNA origami are primarily focused around the ability to exert fine control on systems, especially by constraining positions of molecules, typically by attachment to the DNA origami nanostructures. Current applications are primarily focused on sensing and drug delivery, but many additional applications have been investigated.

== Fabrication ==
Fabrication of DNA origami objects requires a preliminary intuition of 3-dimensional DNA structural design. This can be difficult to grasp due to the complexity of exclusively using adenine-thymine pairings and guanine-cytosine pairings to both fold and unravel double helical DNA molecules such that the output strands produce uniquely desired shapes.

The design software and the choice of base-pair sequences become crucial for creating intricate 2D or even 3D shapes as the key to DNA origami lies in the precise base-pairing between the technique's two building blocks: staple strands and the scaffold. This ensures specific binding and accurate folding. A scaffold strand is a long, single-stranded DNA molecule, often sourced from a virus. Staple strands are shorter DNA strands designed to bind to specific sequences on the scaffold strand, dictating its folding.

To produce a desired shape, images are drawn with a raster fill of a single long DNA molecule. This design is then fed into a computer program that calculates the placement of individual staple strands. Each staple binds to a specific region of the DNA template, and thus due to Watson–Crick base pairing, the necessary sequences of all staple strands are known and displayed. The DNA is mixed, then heated and cooled. As the DNA cools, the various staples pull the long strand into the desired shape. Designs are directly observable via several methods, including electron microscopy, atomic force microscopy, or fluorescence microscopy when DNA is coupled to fluorescent materials.

The process of fabricating DNA origami

Bottom-up self-assembly methods are considered promising alternatives that offer cheap, parallel synthesis of nanostructures under relatively mild conditions.

Since the creation of this method, software has been developed to assist the process using computer-aided design software. This allows researchers to use a computer to determine the way to create the correct staples needed to form a certain shape. One such software called caDNAno is an open source software for creating such structures from DNA. The use of software has not only increased the ease of the process but has also drastically reduced the errors made by manual calculations.

After meticulously planning the sequence of the staple strands with software to ensure they bind the scaffold strand at the intended points, the designed staple strand sequences are synthesized in a lab using techniques like automated DNA synthesis. Finally, the scaffold strand and staple strands are mixed in a buffer solution and subjected to a specific temperature cycle. This cycle allows the staple strands to find their complementary sequences on the scaffold strand and bind through hydrogen bonding, causing the scaffold to fold into the desired shape.

== Dynamic structures and modifications ==
As in the broader field of DNA nanotechnology, DNA origami may be made dynamic in nature through the use of a variety of methods. The three primary methods of creating a dynamic DNA origami machine are toehold mediated strand displacement, enzymatic reactions, and base stacking. While these methods are most commonly used, additional methods for creating dynamic DNA origami machines exist, such as designing a directional component and using brownian motion to drive rotational movement of structures or leveraging less commonly used DNA self-assembly phenomena like G-quadruplexes or i-motifs which can be pH sensitive.

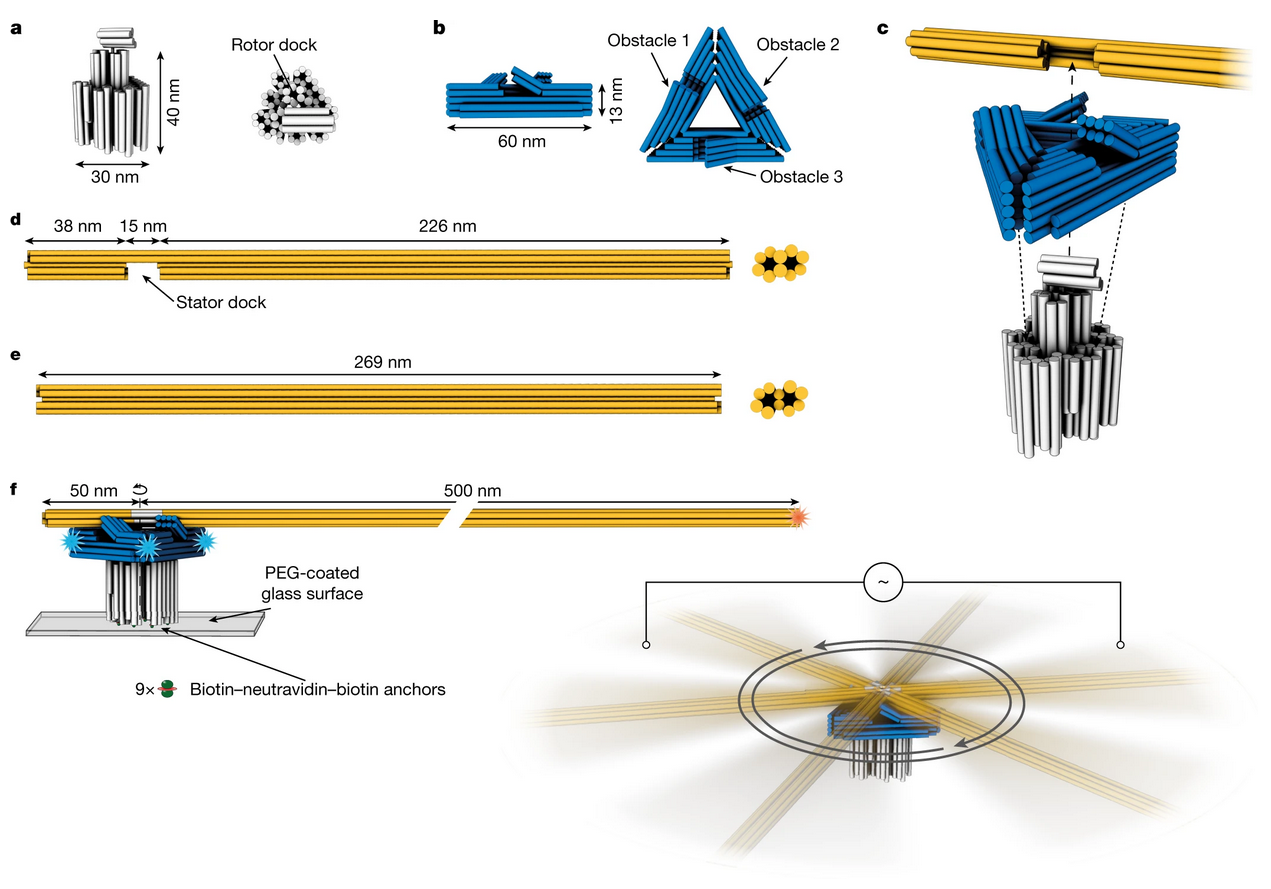
A DNA origami dynamic machine using a directional component and Brownian motion to generate rotation

Modifications can be otherwise used to affect structural properties, to impart unique chemistry to the nanostructures, or to add stimuli responses to the nanostructures. Modifications to structures can be made through conjugation of molecules such as proteins, or through chemical modification of the DNA bases themselves. pH dependent responses, light dependent responses, and more have been shown through modified systems.

One example application of creating dynamic structures is the ability to have a stimulus response resulting in drug release, which is presented by several groups. Other, less common applications comes in sensing moving mechanisms in vivo such as the unwinding of helicase.

== DNA Legos ==
=== Introduction and History of DNA Legos ===
DNA origami has been used to assemble a range of two-dimensional and three-dimensional nanostructures; however, each different structure requires a new design and a new set of scaffold strand and staple strands. This limits scalability and structure yield efficiency. Researchers have developed “DNA brick” or “DNA Lego” technologies by making single stranded tiles (SSTs). SSTs allow for the production of larger structures without a scaffold strand and with the ease of arranging the predesigned blocks into bigger structures. Much like how actual Lego bricks allow specific assembly configurations, DNA Lego bricks bind at specific sites to form a range of shapes. Appropriate selection of blocks to include in an assembly mixture allows production of a variety of complex 3D shapes without a scaffold strand and without having to design an entirely different structure.

With the DNA Lego brick approach, the DNA strand binds to neighboring strands to form a “brick”. By selecting subsets of strands to form a larger shape, researchers demonstrated that many 3D structures could be assembled from the same general set of components or bricks. The authors called this a “voxel-based” design strategy meaning that each 8-base pair interaction between bricks defines a voxel with dimensions 2.5 by 2.5 nm. Since each DNA interaction can be analogized to Lego construction, we can also claim one voxel corresponds to one stud Lego brick.

This scaffold-free strategy has also been extended to larger multicomponent structures. For example, the construction of multi-micron structures into larger architectures was accomplished using “criss-cross” polymerization. In this case, the additive components are “slats” instead of bricks. These slats have binding domains that allow them to attach perpendicularly to form a cross-linked structure. This approach stabilizes the structure, allowing for larger, highly ordered structures to form. This concept further reinforces the concept of smaller DNA components used as Legos to create larger structures without a bottom-up design. This approach also contrasts with earlier DNA origami techniques which relied on intricate computer software to design the scaffold and staple strands to enable creation of larger DNA nanostructures.

=== Brick Structure Synthesis ===
A canonical DNA brick is a “32-nucleotide single strand with four 8-base binding domains (sticky ends)”. While each DNA brick has a distinct nucleotide sequence, they are all able to adopt the brick structure consisting of two 16-nucleotide antiparallel helixes joined by a single phosphate linkage. The two domains attached to the phosphate linkage are designated as “head” and “tail” domains. To bind two DNA bricks, a “head” domain will bind to a neighboring brick if their “tail” domain is the complementary strand of the earlier, and vice versa, producing a 90° dihedral angle. The concept of a Lego-like model is meant to depict the design in a simpler manner. Looking at a singular model in this manner, the two protruding round holes represent the two “tail” domains while recessed round holes represent the two “head” domains. Also, the brick can adopt a horizontal or vertical orientation. Using 3D modeling software such as LegoGen and Cadnano, it is possible to design DNA bricks by simply defining the target shape and subsequently the computer program can analyze it and automatically select the correct subset of bricks for self-assembly of the shape without having to manually design every DNA interaction.

=== Structure Stabilization Improvements ===
DNA brick structures can be used to synthesize various and specific geometries that serve as tools in biological studies. Due to their nucleotide nature, they can quickly dissociate under environmental fluctuations during assembly, in the presence of low concentrations of divalent cations, and in the presence of nucleases. Various methods have been developed to protect and stabilize the DNA structures. However, such methods require the encapsulation of the nanostructure making accessing DNA strands difficult and leading to covalent crosslinking. Kim and Yi presented a stabilization method involving the synthesis of DNA brick nanostructure with dendritic oligonucleotides attached to the outer surface which maintain the DNA accessibility and prevent nuclease digestion. Certain DNA brick motifs remain structurally stable at low divalent salt concentrations and in the presence of nucleases. They demonstrated that neither chemical protectants nor covalent base pair interlocking was necessary to maintain the DNA brick structure stability, especially structures with binding domain lengths of 13 nucleotides or longer. Likewise, coating their surfaces with dendritic oligonucleotides prevented the usage of chemical base-pair interlocking techniques and encapsulation methods as they could still display structural stability in cellular media and made it possible to access the DNA sequences at the surface.

Another potential strategy that can facilitate rapid assembly and enhance stability of DNA bricks is the use of the kinetically interlocking multiple-unit (KIMU) strategy. This strategy was used to determine if multiple unit-DNA (MUD) strands could improve structural stability and accelerate the annealing process for medium to long length DNA strands compared to the traditional short-strand DNA brick assemblies. The KIMU theory suggests that increasing the number of noncovalent units can improve the stability of DNA assembly, create DNA bricks with lengths of ~50 nucleotides, and increase collision between DNA bricks. The MUD assemblies increased the local concentration of nucleotide units and enabled well-assembled DNA structures to recover more readily through kinetic interlocking after dissolution. This interlocking, facilitated by the interaction among multiple units, enhanced the stability of the previous assembly composed entirely of short DNA strands, offering an alternative strategy to fabricate longer but stable DNA structures.

=== Future Outlooks of DNA Legos ===
DNA Legos have promising applications in drug encapsulation and intracellular delivery. DNA nanoparticles are created to have reactive groups with two pegs in a singular direction and two holes in another. This structure allows the bricks to connect and create various shapes. The shapes of the bricks can become complex to encapsulate various drug molecules. These shapes have been applied in an attempt to improve cancer immunotherapies. For example, DNA Legos have been formed into a star shape with sticky ends to encapsulate doxorubicin. When mixed in solution the sticky ends rapidly join together forming an icosahedron shaped brick with the anticancer drug inside of this structure. Another study investigated cellular uptake of spherical nucleic acid bricks (SNAs). Through SNA and dendritic cell interactions, tumor cells are efficiently killed as the spherical brick shape allows for tunable subcellular trafficking and peptide retention. Thus, creating various shaped DNA brick nanoparticles may improve efficacy of immunotherapies by encapsulating drug cargo improving cell uptake.

Before DNA Legos can have clinical applicability as a nanoparticle, they must be stabilized to ensure proper drug release. Previously, RNA bricks have been locked in place by magnesium. Utilizing magnesium to set the shape of RNA bricks via kissing interactions allows for easy tunability of structures. This idea is easily translatable to DNA thus creating a mechanism in which DNA Legos can be stabilized for clinical use.

Aside from drug encapsulation, DNA Legos have many other potential applications including molecular probes for biological studies, rendering spatial control for biosynthesis, and to allow for rapid nanofabrication of complex inorganic molecules. The modularity of the bricks and their ability to self assemble one at a time allows for rapid prototyping and fabrication. The DNA bricks are composed of short synthetic DNA strands thus these strands can be modified to have desirable characteristics or interactions with other molecules. Furthermore, polymers including L-DNA could be used to achieve designer chemical properties allowing for diverse applications of DNA Legos. The ability of the bricks to have tunable shapes and chemical properties contributes to the versatility of DNA Legos as a platform for engineering highly customizable nanoscale systems.

== Biomedical applications ==
DNA origami, being made of a natural biological polymer, is well suited to the biological environment when salt concentrations allow, and offers fine control over the positioning of molecules and structures in the system. This allows DNA origami to be applicable to a number of scenarios in biomedical engineering. Current biomedical applications include drug release with 0 order mechanisms, vaccines, cell signaling, and sensing applications.

DNA is folded into an octahedron and coated with a single bilayer of phospholipid, mimicking the envelope of a virus particle. The DNA nanoparticles, each at about the size of a virion, are able to remain in circulation for hours after being injected into mice. It also elicits a much lower immune response than the uncoated particles. It presents a potential use in drug delivery, reported by researchers at the Wyss Institute at Harvard University.

Researchers at the Harvard University Wyss Institute reported the self-assembling and self-destructing drug delivery vessels using the DNA origami in the lab tests. The DNA nanorobot they created is an open DNA tube with a hinge on one side which can be clasped shut. The drug filled DNA tube is held shut by a DNA aptamer, configured to identify and seek certain diseased related protein. Once the origami nanobots get to the infected cells, the aptamers break apart and release the drug. The first disease model the researchers used was leukemia and lymphoma.

Researchers in the National Center for Nanoscience and Technology in Beijing and Arizona State University reported a DNA origami delivery vehicle for Doxorubicin, a well-known anti-cancer drug. The drug was non-covalently attached to DNA origami nanostructures through intercalation and a high drug load was achieved. The DNA-Doxorubicin complex was taken up by human breast adenocarcinoma cancer cells (MCF-7) via cellular internalization with much higher efficiency than doxorubicin in free form. The enhancement of cell killing activity was observed not only in regular MCF-7, more importantly, also in doxorubicin-resistant cells. The scientists theorized that the doxorubicin-loaded DNA origami inhibits lysosomal acidification, resulting in cellular redistribution of the drug to action sites, thus increasing the cytotoxicity against the tumor cells. Further testing on in vivo on mice suggests that over a 12-day period, Doxorubicin was more effective at reducing tumor sizes in mice when it was contained in DNA origami nanostructures (DONs).

Researchers from the Massachusetts Institute of Technology are developing a method to attach various viral antigens to Virus-shaped DNA particles to mimic the virus to be used to develop new vaccines. This was started in 2016 when Bathe's lab created an algorithm known as DAEDALUS (DNA Origami Sequence Design Algorithm for User-defined Structures) to generate precision-controlled three-dimensional shapes of DNA. Using the tool they designed virus-shaped scaffolding that can modularly attach different antigens to the surface of the DNA scaffold. Currently, MIT is working to develop optimal geometries for B cells to recognize HIV antigens. Further research has attempted to replace HIV antigens with SARS-CoV-2 and are testing whether vaccines show proper immune response from isolated B cells and in mice.

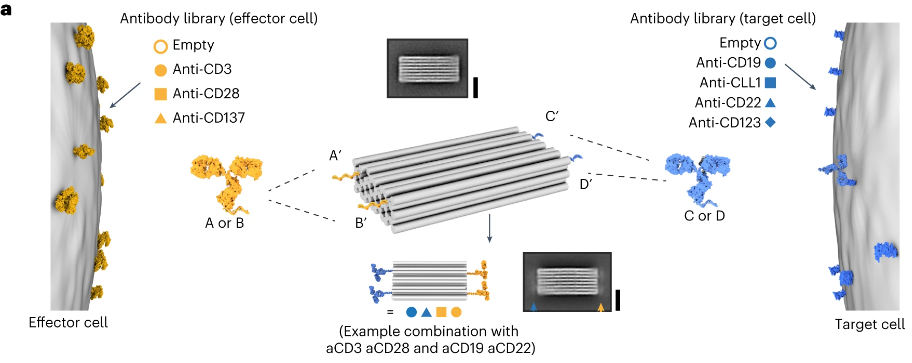
A diagram of DNA origami being attached to antigens to generate Programmable T-cell Engagers.

Similarly, researchers from the Technical University of Munich and LMU Munich have developed a method to have T-cells target tumor cells by using antigen coated DNA origami. The researchers developed a method to create chassis known as programmable T-cell Engagers (PTEs) which are DNA origami structures that can be configured to bind to user-defined target cells and T-cells based on which antigens are coated on the surfaces of the nanostructure. The in vitro results show that after 24 hours of exposure 90% of the tumor cells were destroyed. Meanwhile, in vivo testing showed that their PTEs were capable of binding to the target proteins for several hours which validates the mechanism they designed.

== Nanotechnology applications ==
Many potential applications have been suggested in literature, including enzyme immobilization, drug delivery systems, and nanotechnological self-assembly of materials. Though DNA is not the natural choice for building active structures for nanorobotic applications, due to its lack of structural and catalytic versatility, several papers have examined the possibility of molecular walkers on origami and switches for algorithmic computing. The following paragraphs list some of the reported applications conducted in the laboratories with clinical potential.

In a study conducted by a group of scientists from iNANO center and CDNA Center at Aarhus university, researchers were able to construct a small multi-switchable 3D DNA Box Origami. The proposed nanoparticle was characterized by AFM, TEM and FRET. The constructed box was shown to have a unique reclosing mechanism, which enabled it to repeatedly open and close in response to a unique set of DNA or RNA keys. The authors proposed that this "DNA device can potentially be used for a broad range of applications such as controlling the function of single molecules, controlled drug delivery, and molecular computing."

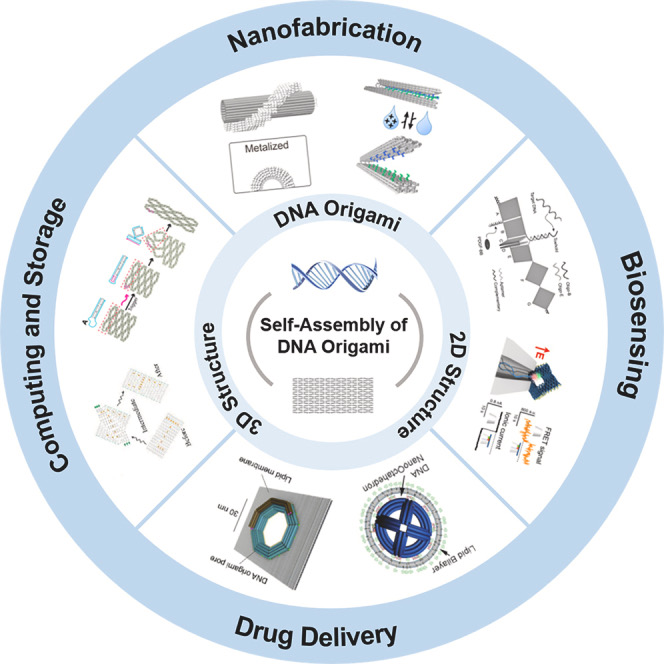
A diagram of molecular self-assembly of DNA origami structures for nanotechnological applications.

Nanorobots made of DNA origami demonstrated computing capacities and completed pre-programmed task inside the living organism was reported by a team of bioengineers at Wyss Institute at Harvard University and Institute of Nanotechnology and Advanced Materials at Bar-Ilan University. As a proof of concept, the team injected various kinds of nanobots (the curled DNA encasing molecules with fluorescent markers) into live cockroaches. By tracking the markers inside the cockroaches, the team found the accuracy of delivery of the molecules (released by the uncurled DNA) in target cells, the interactions among the nanobots and the control are equivalent to a computer system. The complexity of the logic operations, the decisions and actions, increases with the increased number of nanobots. The team estimated that the computing power in the cockroach can be scaled up to that of an 8-bit computer.

A research group at the Indian Institute of Science used nanostructures to develop a platform to elucidate the coaxial stacking between DNA bases. This approach utilized DNA-PAINT based super-resolution microscopy for visualizing these DNA nanostructures and performed DNA binding kinetics analysis to elucidate the fundamental force of base-stacking that helps stabilize the DNA double helical structure. They went on to assemble multimeric DNA origami nanostructures termed as a 'three-point star' into a tetrahedral 3D origami structure. The assembly relied chiefly on base-stacking interactions between each subunit. The group further showed that the knowledge of such interactions can be used to predict and thus tune the relative stabilities of these multimeric DNA nanostructures.

== Similar approaches ==
The idea of using protein design to accomplish the same goals as DNA origami has surfaced as well. Researchers at the National Institute of Chemistry in Slovenia are working on using rational design of protein folding to create structures much like those seen with DNA origami. The main focus of current research in protein folding design is in the drug delivery field, using antibodies attached to proteins as a way to create a targeted vehicle.

== See also ==
- RNA origami
- DNA nanotechnology
- Molecular self-assembly
- Folding@home
- Origami
- Aptamer
