= Double crossover =

Double crossover may refer to:

- Two pairs of railway switches forming two connections that cross over between two parallel tracks
- An artificial nucleic acid structural motif used in DNA nanotechnology
