= Thomas LaBean =

American biochemist

Thomas (Thom) Henry LaBean is an American biochemist, bioengineer and professor at North Carolina State University. He was previously a research professor at Duke University. He is a leading researcher in the field of DNA nanotechnology.

LaBean graduated from Michigan State University in 1985 with a BSc in biochemistry. In 1993, he was awarded a PhD in biochemistry by the University of Pennsylvania.

== Works ==
- DNA-Templated Self-Assembly of Protein Arrays and Highly Conductive Nanowires, Hao Yan, Sung Ha Park, Gleb Finkelstein, John H. Reif, Thomas H. LaBean, Science, 26, 2003, 1882-1884
- Nanofabrication by DNA self-assembly (Review article), Hanying Li, Joshua D. Carter, Thomas H. LaBean, Materials Today, 2009
