= Nataša Jonoska =

Macedonian mathematician and computer scientist

- Born: 1961 (age 63–64)
- Education: Ss. Cyril and Methodius University of Skopje; Binghamton University
- Awards: Rosenberg Tulip Award in DNA Computing, 2007
- Scientific career
- Fields: Mathematics, Computer science, DNA computing
- Institutions: University of South Florida
- Thesis: Synchronizing Representations of Sofic Systems (1993)
- Website: shell.cas.usf.edu/~jonoska/

Nataša Jonoska (Macedonian: Наташа Јоноска, pronounced [na'taʃa jɔ'noska]; born 1961, also spelled Natasha Jonoska) is a Macedonian mathematician and professor at the University of South Florida known for her work in DNA computing. Her research is about how biology performs computation, "in particular using formal models such as cellular or other finite types of automata, formal language theory symbolic dynamics, and topological graph theory to describe molecular computation".

She received her bachelor's degree in mathematics and computer science from Ss. Cyril and Methodius University of Skopje in Yugoslavia (now North Macedonia) in 1984. She earned her PhD in mathematics from the State University of New York at Binghamton in 1993 with the dissertation "Synchronizing Representations of Sofic Systems". Her dissertation advisor was Tom Head.

In 2007, she won the Rosenberg Tulip Award in DNA Computing for her work in applications of Automata theory and graph theory to DNA nanotechnology. She was elected a AAAS Fellow in 2014 for advancements in understanding information processing in molecular self-assembly. She is a board member for many journals including Theoretical Computer Science, the International Journal of Foundations of Computer Science, Computability, and Natural Computing. In 2022 she was awarded a Simons Fellowship.

== Select publications ==
- J. Chen, N. Jonoska, G. Rozenberg, (eds). Nanotechnology: Science and Computing, Springer- Verlag 2006.
- N. Jonoska, Gh. Paun, G. Rozenberg, (eds.). Aspects of Molecular Computing LNCS 2950, Springer-Verlag 2004.
- N. Jonoska, N.C. Seeman, (eds.). DNA Computing, Revised papers from the 7th International Meeting on DNA-Based Computers, LNCS 2340, Springer-Verlag 2002.
