= SU(1,1) interferometry =

Interferometry technique

SU(1,1) interferometry is a technique that uses parametric amplification for splitting and mixing of electromagnetic waves for precise estimation of phase change and achieves the Heisenberg limit of sensitivity with fewer optical elements than conventional interferometric techniques.

== Introduction ==
Interferometry is an important technique in the field of optics that have been utilised for fundamental proof of principles experiments and in the development of new technologies. This technique, primarily based on the interference of electromagnetic waves, has been widely explored in the field of quantum metrology and precision measurements for achieving sensitivity in measurements beyond what is possible with classical methods and resources. Interferometry is a desired platform for precise estimation of physical quantities because of its ability to sense small phase changes. One of the most prominent examples of the application of this property is the detection of gravitational waves (LIGO).

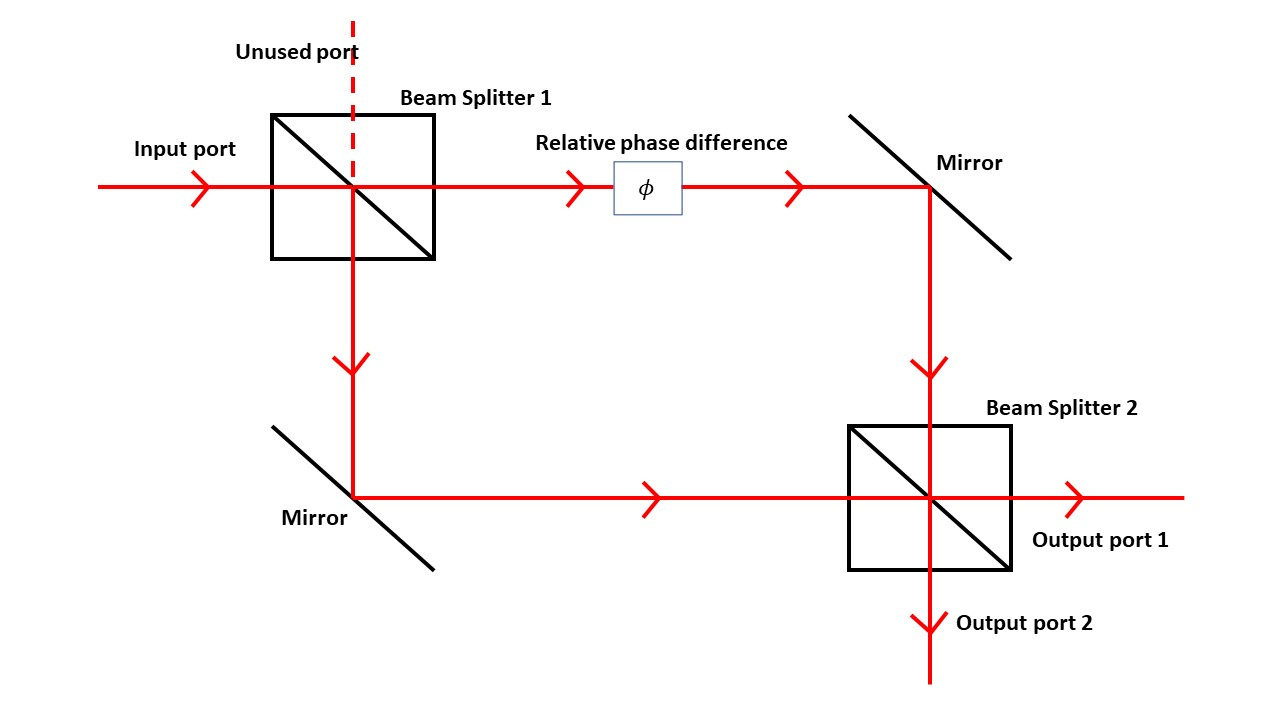
Schematic of a conventional Mach-Zehnder interferometer.

Conventional interferometers are based on the wave nature of the light and hence the classical interference of electromagnetic waves. Although the design and layout for these types of interferometers can vary depending upon the type of application and corresponding suitable scheme, they all can be mapped to an arrangement similar to that of a Mach-Zehnder interferometer. In this type of interferometry, the input field is split into two by a beam splitter which then propagates along different paths and acquires a relative phase difference (corresponding to a path length difference). Considering one of the beams undergoing a phase change as the probe and the other beam as the reference, the relative phase is estimated after the two beams interfere at another beam splitter. The estimation of the phase difference is done through the detection of the intensity change at the output after the interference at the second beam splitter.

These standard interferometric techniques, based on beam-splitters for the splitting of the beams and linear optical transformations, can be classified as SU(2) interferometers as these interferometric techniques can be naturally characterized by SU(2) (Special Unitary(2)) group. Theoretically, the sensitivity of conventional SU(2) interferometric schemes are limited by the vacuum fluctuation noise, also called the shot-noise limit which scales as $1/\sqrt N$, where $N$ is the mean number of particles (photons for electromagnetic waves) entering the input port of the interferometer. The shot noise limit can be overcome by using light that utilizes quantum properties such as quantum entanglement (e.g. squeezed states, NOON states), at the unused input port. In principle, this can achieve the Heisenberg limit of sensitivity which scales as $1/N$ with the change in the mean number of photons entering the input port.

SU(1,1) interferometers were first proposed by Yurke et al. in which the beam splitters in conventional interferometers were replaced by optical parametric amplifiers. The advantage that comes with the parametric amplifiers is that the input fields can be coherently split and interfere that would be fundamentally quantum in nature. This is attributed to the nonlinear processes in parametric amplifiers such as four-wave mixing. Theoretically, SU(1,1) interferometers can achieve the Heisenberg limit of sensitivity with fewer optical elements than conventional interferometers.

== Theory ==
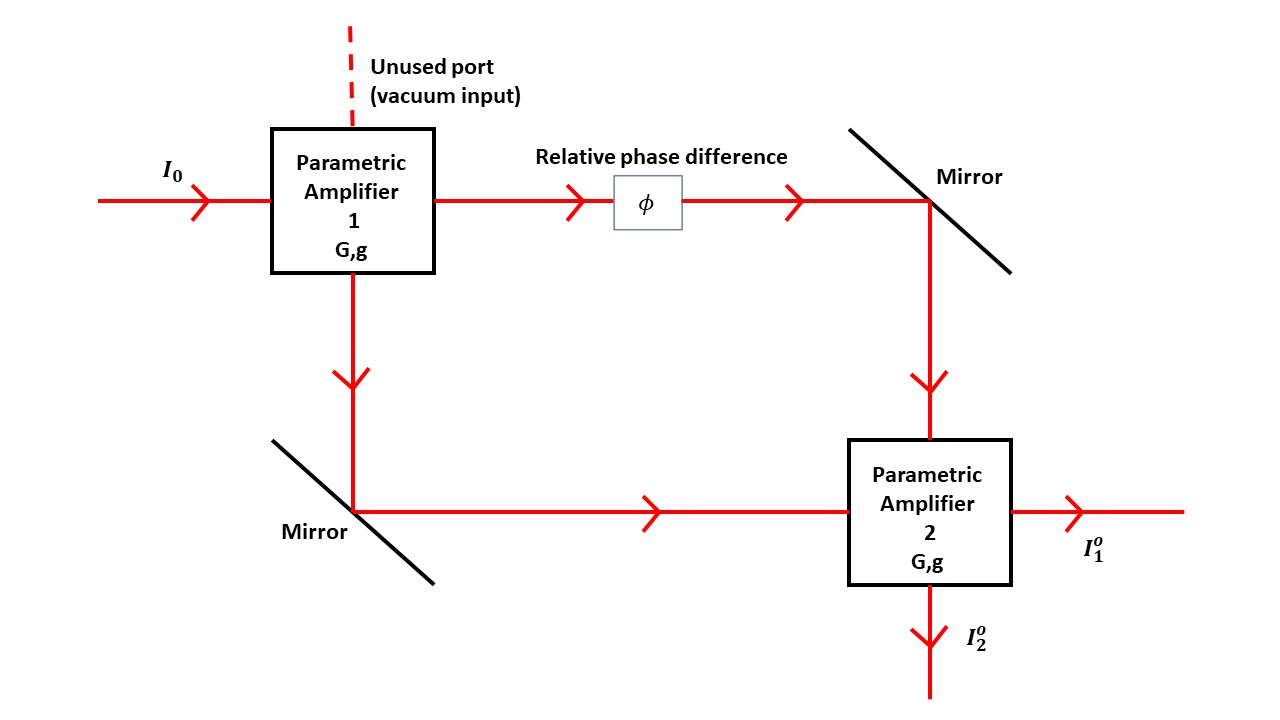
Schematic of a balanced SU(1,1) interferometer with a coherent state injection in one of the input ports and no input (vacuum) in the other port. Parametric amplifiers have gains G,g.

To briefly understand the benefit of using a parametric amplifier, a balanced SU(1,1) interferometer can be considered. Treating the input fields as quantum fields described by operators $a_1 ^{in}$ ,$a_2 ^{in}$, the output quantum fields from a parametric amplifier can be written as:

$a_1 ^{o} = G a_1 ^{in} + g a_2 ^{in}$

$a_2 ^{o} = g a_1 ^{in} + G a_2 ^{in}$

where $G$ is the amplitude gain and $\left\vert G \right\vert^2 - \left\vert g \right\vert^2 = 1$.

For a coherent state input $|\alpha\rangle$ at the first parametric amplifier with initial input intensity $I_0 = \left\vert \alpha \right\vert^2$, the output intensities will be:

$I_1 ^o = 2G^2 g^2 I_0 (1+\cos\phi)$ (for $\left\vert \alpha \right\vert^2 >>1$)

$I_2 ^o = (2G^2 g^2 + 1)(\left\vert \alpha \right\vert^2)(1+\nu\cos\phi)$ (for $\left\vert \alpha \right\vert^2 >>1$)

where $\nu = \frac{2G^2 g^2}{2G^2 g^2 + 1}$ is the visibility.

This shows two main distinguishing features of an SU(1,1) interferometer from SU(2) interferometers:

$1.$ The two output intensities of an SU(1,1) interferometer are in phase whereas in a SU(2) interferometer the two outputs are out of phase.

$2.$ The outputs are amplified as compared to that of a SU(2) interferometer when the gain $G$ is large.

The first feature indicates a high correlation of the output photon numbers (intensities) and the second feature shows that there is an enhancement of the signal strength for a small phase change as compared to SU(2) interferometers.

From these properties, the signal to noise ratio $R_{SU(1,1)}$ for an SU(1,1) interferometer compared to the signal to noise ratio $R_{SU(2)}$ of a SU(2) interferometer is calculated to be (see Ref. for detailed calculation):

$R_{SU(1,1)}/R_{SU(2)} \approx 2G^2$ (for $\left\vert \alpha \right\vert^2 >>1$)

This means that the sensitivity in phase measurements is improved by a factor of $2G^2$ in an SU(1,1) interferometer and hence can achieve the sub-shot noise limit of sensitivity in conditions where a SU(2) interferometer approaches the shot-noise limit. It is also shown in Ref. that with no coherent state injection, the SU(1,1) interferometer approaches the Heisenberg limit of sensitivity.

=== Noise performance ===
The improvement of phase measurement sensitivity in an SU(1,1) interferometer is not by a $2G^2$ amplification at the second parametric amplifier. Similar amplification could also be implemented in a SU(2) interferometer where both the signal and the noise (vacuum quantum fluctuations) gets amplified. However, the difference comes in the noise performance of an SU(1,1) interferometer.

A quantum amplifier (in this case a parametric amplifier) can utilize quantum entanglement for effective noise cancellation. For an input state with a strong correlation with the internal modes of an amplifier, the quantum noise can be cancelled at the output through destructive quantum interference. This is the principle behind noise reduction in an SU(1,1) interferometer. The first parametric amplifier produces two quantum entangled fields that are used for phase sensing and are the input to the second parametric amplifier where the amplification takes place. In a scenario of no internal losses inside the interferometer, the output noise for a destructive quantum interference is still similar to the case of a SU(2) interferometer. Overall, there is an amplification in the signal with no change in the noise (as compared to SU(2) interferometer). This leads to the improvement in phase sensitivity over SU(2) interferometry.

=== Effect of losses ===
The reduced sensitivity of an interferometer can be mainly due to two types of losses. One of the sources of losses is the inefficient detection protocol. Another type of loss affecting the sensitivity is the internal loss of an interferometer. Theoretical studies by Marino et al. inferred that an SU(1,1) interferometer is robust against losses due to inefficient detectors because of the disentanglement of states at the second parametric amplifier before the measurements. However, the internal losses in an SU(1,1) interferometer limit its sensitivity below the Heisenberg limit during its physical implementation.

The original scheme for an SU(1,1) interferometer proposed by Yurke et al. did not take into account the internal losses and for a moderate gain of the parametric amplifier produced a low number of photons which made it difficult for its experimental realization. Marino et al. showed that in the presence of any internal losses, an SU(1,1) interferometer could not achieve the Heisenberg limit for configurations with no input fields at both the ports or a coherent state input in one of the ports (this configuration was considered for the Theory section above). For a case with coherent state input at both the input ports, it was shown that the interferometer is robust against internal losses and is one of the ideal schemes for achieving the Heisenberg limit.

== Experiments ==
The originally proposed configuration of an SU(1,1) interferometer by Yurke et al. was challenging to realize experimentally due to very low photon numbers expected at the output (for ideal sensitivity) and also the theory did not take into account the internal losses that could affect the phase change sensitivity of the interferometer. Subsequently, modifications to the scheme were studied taking into account the losses and other experimental imperfections. Some of the initial experiments proving the predicted scaling of the SU(1,1) interferometer and other experiments modifying the scheme are discussed below.

=== Coherent state boosted SU(1,1) interferometer ===
The boost in the photon numbers from a coherent state injection was proposed and studied by Plick et al.. Such a scheme was experimentally implemented by Jing et al. with Rb-85 vapor cells for parametric amplification. The experiment verified the increase in the fringe size due to the amplification of the signal. Later, experiments performed by Hudelist et al. showed that there is an enhancement in the signal by a factor of $2G^2$ with SU(1,1) interferometry over the conventional SU(2) interferometry.

=== Modified SU(1,1) interferometers ===
Modifications to SU(1,1) interferometers have been proposed and studied with the goal of finding an experimentally ideal scheme with the desired characteristics of SU(1,1) interferometry. Some of the schemes explored include:

1. SU(1,1) interferometry with one parametric amplifier and a beam splitter replacing the second amplifier: The signal to noise ratio improvement in this configuration was found to be essentially the same as that of the original SU(1,1) interferometry sensitivity improvement over conventional interferometers. This study showed that the improvement is mainly due to the entangled fields generated at the first parametric amplifier.

2. "Truncated" SU(1,1) interferometer with no second parametric amplifier and rather using a photocurrent mixer to realize the superposition of the fields. Such a configuration opens the possibility to implement SU(1,1) interferometry in experiments where fewer optical elements help minimize the error due to experimental imperfections.
