= DNA walker =

Nucleic acid nanomachine

A DNA walker is a class of nucleic acid nanomachines where a nucleic acid "walker" is able to move along a nucleic acid "track". The concept of a DNA walker was first defined and named by John H. Reif in 2003. A nonautonomous DNA walker requires external changes for each step, whereas an autonomous DNA walker progresses without any external changes. Various nonautonomous DNA walkers were developed, for example Shin controlled the motion of DNA walker by using 'control strands' which needed to be manually added in a specific order according to the template's sequence in order to get the desired path of motion. In 2004 the first autonomous DNA walker, which did not require external changes for each step, was experimentally demonstrated by the Reif group.

DNA walkers have functional properties such as a range of motion extending from linear to 2 and 3-dimensional, the ability to pick up and drop off molecular cargo, performing DNA-templated synthesis, and increased velocity of motion. DNA walkers have potential applications ranging from nanomedicine to nanorobotics. Many different fuel options have been studied including DNA hybridization, hydrolysis of DNA or ATP, and light. The DNA walker's function is similar to that of the proteins dynein and kinesin.

== Role in DNA nanotechnology ==
Finding a suitable nanoscale motor capable of autonomous, unidirectional, linear motion is considered important to the development of DNA nanotechnology. The walkers have been shown to be capable of autonomous motion over linear, 2-dimensional and 3-dimensional DNA 'tracks' through a large number of schemes. In July 2005, Bath et al. showed that another way to control DNA walker motion is to use restriction enzymes to strategically cleave the 'track', causing the forward motion of the walkers. In 2010, two different sets of researchers exhibited the walkers' more complex abilities to selectively pick up and drop off molecular cargo and to perform DNA-templated synthesis as the walker moves along the track. In late 2015, Yehl et al. showed that three orders of magnitude higher than the speeds of motion seen previously were possible when using DNA-coated spherical particles that would "roll" on a surface modified with RNA complementary to the nanoparticle's DNA. RNase H was used to hydrolyse the RNA, releasing the bound DNA and allowing the DNA to hybridize to RNA further downstream. In 2018, Valero et al. described a DNA walker based on two interlocked, catenated circular double-stranded DNAs (dsDNAs) and an engineered T7 RNA polymerase (T7RNAP) firmly attached to one of the DNA circles. This stator-ring unidirectionally rotated the interlocked rotor-ring by rolling circle transcription (RCT), driven by nucleotide triphosphate (NTP) hydrolysis, thereby constituting a catenated DNA wheel motor. The wheel motor produces long, repetitive RNA transcripts that remain attached to the DNA-catenane and are used to guide its directional walking along predefined ssDNA tracks arranged on a DNA nanotube.

== Applications ==
The applications of DNA walkers include nanomedicine, diagnostic sensing of biological samples, nanorobotics and much more. In late 2015, Yehl et al. improved the DNA walker's function by increasing its velocity, and it has been proposed as the basis for a low-cost, low-tech diagnostics machine capable of detecting single nucleotide mutations and heavy-metal contamination in water. In 2018 Nils Walter and his team designed a DNA walker that is capable of moving at a speed of 300 nanometres per minute. This is an order of magnitude faster than the pace of other types of DNA walker.

== See also ==
- DNA nanotechnology
- Nanorobotics
- Nanomedicine
