= Bernard Yurke =

American physicist

- Education: Cornell University; The University of Texas at Austin
- Known for: Entanglement swapping DNA machine SU (1,1) Interferometry; Toehold mediated strand displacement
- Scientific career
- Fields: Quantum information Biophysics
- Workplaces: Boise State University

Bernard Yurke is an American physicist, currently a distinguished research professor at Boise State University and an Elected Fellow of the American Association for the Advancement of Science.

== See also ==
- DNA nanotechnology
