= Toehold mediated strand displacement =

Toehold mediated strand displacement (TMSD) is an enzyme-free molecular tool to exchange one strand of DNA or RNA (output) with another strand (input). It is based on the hybridization of two complementary strands of DNA or RNA via Watson-Crick base pairing (A-T/U and C-G) and makes use of a process called branch migration. Although branch migration has been known to the scientific community since the 1970s, TMSD has not been introduced to the field of DNA nanotechnology until 2000 when Yurke et al. was the first who took advantage of TMSD. He used the technique to open and close a set of DNA tweezers made of two DNA helices using an auxiliary strand of DNA as fuel. Since its first use, the technique has been modified for the construction of autonomous molecular motors, catalytic amplifiers, reprogrammable DNA nanostructures and molecular logic gates. It has also been used in conjunction with RNA for the production of kinetically-controlled ribosensors. TMSD starts with a double-stranded DNA complex composed of the original strand and the protector strand. The original strand has an overhanging region the so-called "toehold" which is complementary to a third strand of DNA referred to as the "invading strand". The invading strand is a sequence of single-stranded DNA (ssDNA) which is complementary to the original strand. The toehold regions initiate the process of TMSD by allowing the complementary invading strand to hybridize with the original strand, creating a DNA complex composed of three strands of DNA. This initial endothermic step is rate limiting and can be tuned by varying the strength (length and sequence composition e.g. G-C or A-T rich strands) of the toehold region. The ability to tune the rate of strand displacement over a range of 6 orders of magnitude generates the backbone of this technique and allows the kinetic control of DNA or RNA devices. After the binding of the invading strand and the original strand occurred, branch migration of the invading domain then allows the displacement of the initial hybridized strand (protector strand). The protector strand can possess its own unique toehold and can, therefore, turn into an invading strand itself, starting a strand-displacement cascade. The whole process is energetically favored and although a reverse reaction can occur its rate is up to 6 orders of magnitude slower. Additional control over the system of toehold mediated strand displacement can be introduced by toehold sequestering.

A slightly different variant of strand displacement has also been introduced using a strand displacing polymerase enzyme. Unlike TMSD, it used the polymerase enzyme as a source of energy and it referred to as polymerase-based strand displacement.

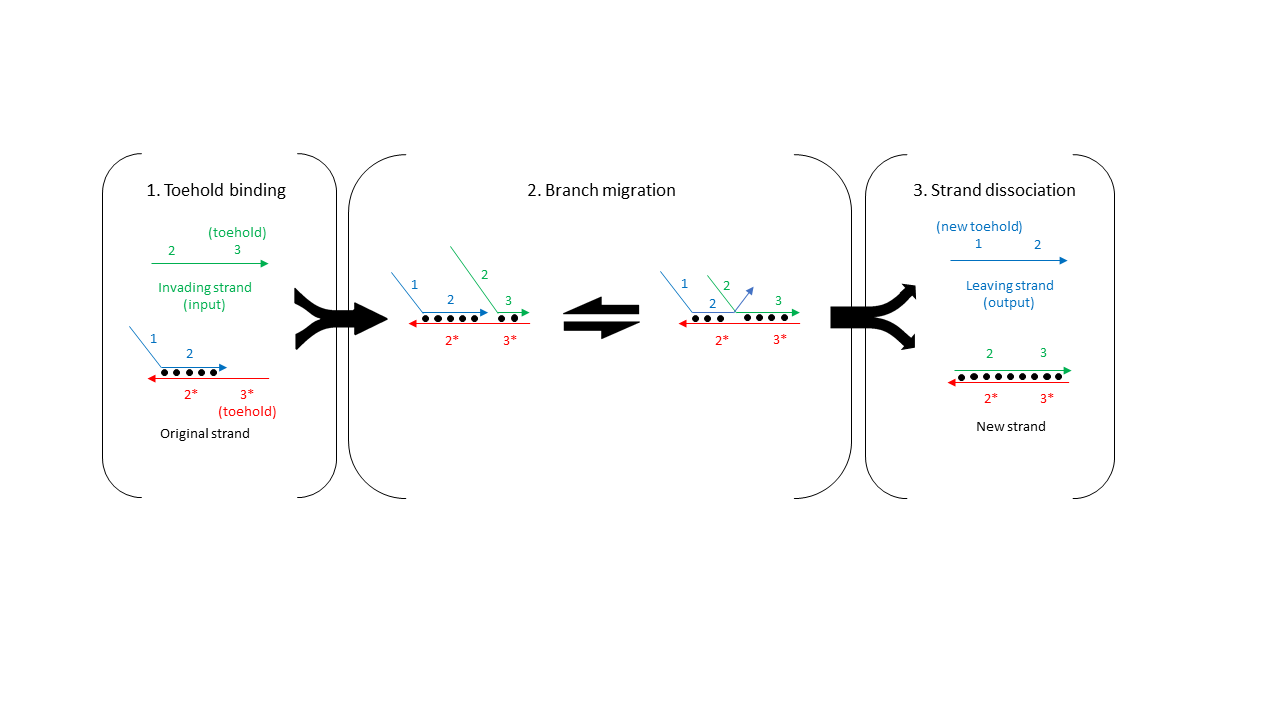
Toehold mediated strand displacement

== Toehold sequestering ==
Toehold sequestering is a technique to "mask" the toehold region, rendering its accessibility. There are several ways to do so but the most common approaches are hybridizing the toehold with a complementary strand or by designing the toehold region to form a hairpin loop. Masking and unmasking of the toehold domains together with the ability to precisely control the kinetics of the reaction makes toehold mediated strand displacement a valuable tool in the field of DNA nanotechnology Moreover, biosensors based on toehold mediated strand displacement reaction are useful in single molecule detection of DNA targets and SNP discrimination.
