= Andrew Turberfield =

British nanotechnologist

Andrew J Turberfield is a British Professor of Physics based at the University of Oxford. Turberfield's research is largely based on DNA nanostructures and photonic crystals, and his work on both nanomachines and photonic crystals has been highly cited. Turberfield is a fellow of Magdalen College, Oxford.

In 2011 he won the Institute of Physics David Tabor Medal and Prize.
