= Nadrian Seeman =

American physicist (1945–2021)

Nadrian C. Seeman
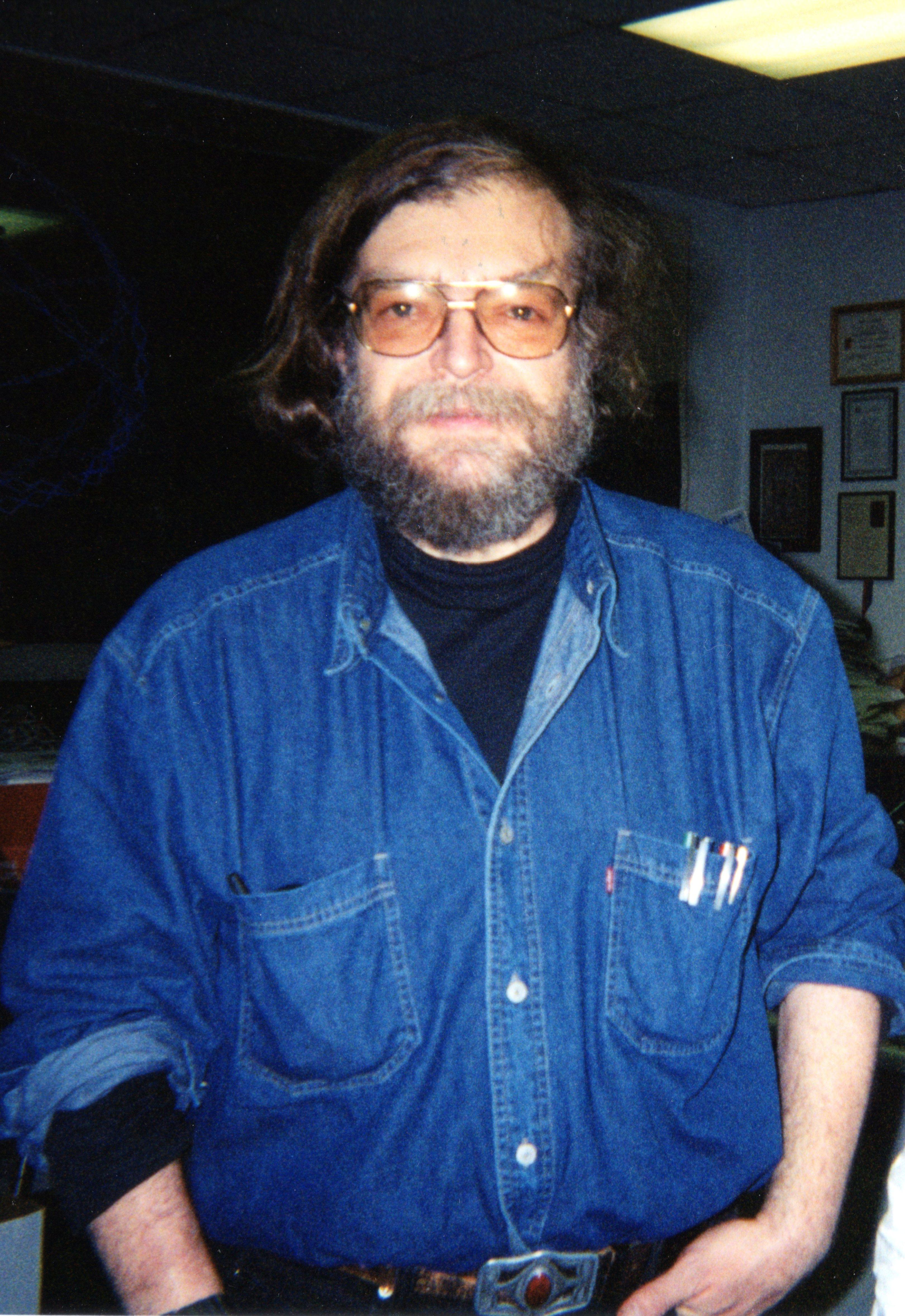
- Seeman in 2002
- Born: December 16, 1945; Chicago, Illinois, U.S.
- Died: November 16, 2021 (aged 75)
- Education: University of Chicago, University of Pittsburgh
- Known for: DNA nanotechnology
- Awards: Kavli Prize in Nanoscience (2010); William H. Nichols Medal (2008); Benjamin Franklin Medal in Chemistry (2016)
- Scientific career
- Fields: Nanotechnology, Crystallography
- Workplaces: New York University
- Doctoral students: Hao Yan

Nadrian C. "Ned" Seeman (December 16, 1945 – November 16, 2021) was an American nanotechnologist and crystallographer known for inventing the field of DNA nanotechnology.

== Biography ==
Seeman studied biochemistry at the University of Chicago and crystallography at the University of Pittsburgh. He was a postdoctoral researcher with Alexander Rich at MIT. He became a faculty member at the State University of New York at Albany, and in 1988 moved to the Department of Chemistry at New York University.

He is most noted for his development of the concept of DNA nanotechnology beginning in the early 1980s. In fall 1980, while at a campus pub, Seeman was inspired by the M. C. Escher woodcut Depth to realize that a three-dimensional lattice could be constructed from DNA. He realized that this could be used to orient target molecules, simplifying their crystallographic study by eliminating the difficult process of obtaining pure crystals. In pursuit of this goal, Seeman's laboratory published the synthesis of the first three-dimensional nanoscale object, a cube made of DNA, in 1991. This work won the 1995 Feynman Prize in Nanotechnology. The concept of the dissimilar double DNA crossover introduced by Seeman, was important stepping stone towards the development of DNA origami. The goal of demonstrating designed three-dimensional DNA crystals was achieved by Seeman in 2009, nearly thirty years after his original elucidation of the idea.

The concepts of DNA nanotechnology later found further applications in DNA computing, DNA nanorobotics, and self-assembly of nanoelectronics. He shared the Kavli Prize in Nanoscience 2010 with Donald Eigler “for their development of unprecedented methods to control matter on the nanoscale.” He was a fellow of the Norwegian Academy of Science and Letters.

He was an atheist. Seeman died on November 16, 2021, at the age of 75.

== Notable publications ==
- Seeman, N (1982). "Nucleic acid junctions and lattices". Journal of Theoretical Biology. 99 (2): 237–47. Bibcode:1982JThBi..99..237S. doi:10.1016/0022-5193(82)90002-9. PMID 6188926.—Considered to be the earliest paper outlining the concepts of DNA nanotechnology
- Chen, Junghuei; Seeman, Nadrian C. (1991). "Synthesis from DNA of a molecule with the connectivity of a cube". Nature. 350 (6319): 631–3. Bibcode:1991Natur.350..631C. doi:10.1038/350631a0. PMID 2017259. S2CID 4347988.—The synthesis of the DNA cube
- Winfree, Erik; Liu, Furong; Wenzler, Lisa A.; Seeman, Nadrian C. (6 August 1998). "Design and self-assembly of two-dimensional DNA crystals". Nature. 394 (6693): 529–544. Bibcode:1998Natur.394..539W. doi:10.1038/28998. ISSN 0028-0836. PMID 9707114. S2CID 4385579.—The synthesis of two-dimensional periodic lattices of double crossover molecules
- Mao, Chengde; Sun, Weiqiong; Shen, Zhiyong; Seeman, Nadrian C. (14 January 1999). "A DNA Nanomechanical Device Based on the B-Z Transition". Nature. 397 (6715): 144–146. doi:10.1038/16437. ISSN 0028-0836. PMID 9923675. S2CID 4406177.—The first DNA-based nanomechanical device
- Seeman, Nadrian C. (June 2004). "Nanotechnology and the double helix". Scientific American. 290 (6): 64–75. Bibcode:2004SciAm.290f..64S. doi:10.1038/scientificamerican0604-64. PMID 15195395.—A popular science article explaining the field of DNA nanotechnology
- Zheng, Jianping; Birktoft, Jens J.; Chen, Yi; Wang, Tong; Sha, Ruojie; Constantinou, Pamela E.; Ginell, Stephan L.; Mao, Chengde; Seeman, Nadrian C. (2009). "From molecular to macroscopic via the rational design of a self-assembled 3D DNA crystal". Nature. 461 (7260): 74–7. Bibcode:2009Natur.461...74Z. doi:10.1038/nature08274. PMC 2764300. PMID 19727196.—The synthesis of three-dimensional periodic lattices of tensegrity triangle molecules
- Gu, Hongzhou; Chao, Jie; Xiao, Shou-Jun; Seeman, Nadrian C. (2010). "A proximity-based programmable DNA nanoscale assembly line". Nature. 465 (7295): 202–5. Bibcode:2010Natur.465..202G. doi:10.1038/nature09026. PMC 2872101. PMID 20463734.—A DNA-based molecular assembly line

== See also ==
- History of DNA nanotechnology
