= RuvABC =

Protein complex

RuvABC is a complex of three proteins that mediate branch migration and resolve the Holliday junction created during homologous recombination in bacteria. As such, RuvABC is critical to bacterial DNA repair.

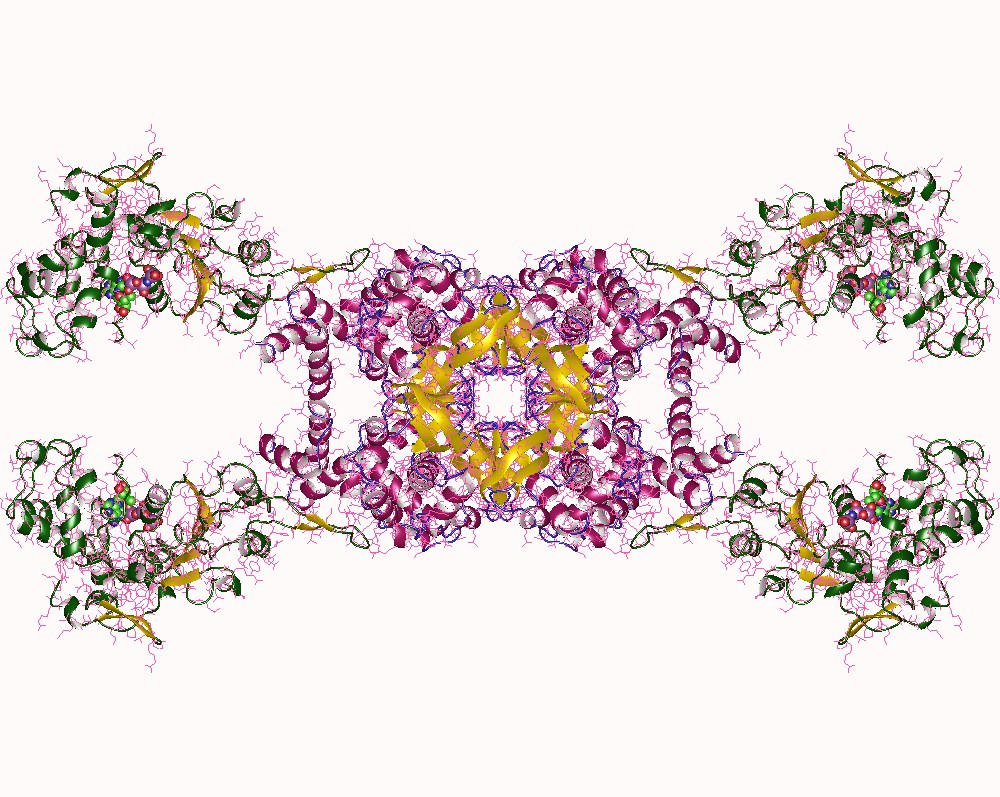
RuvA-RuvB complex heteromer, Thermus thermophilus

RuvA and RuvB bind to the four strand DNA structure formed in the Holliday junction intermediate, and migrate the strands through each other, using a putative spooling mechanism. The RuvAB complex can carry out DNA helicase activity, which helps unwind the duplex DNA. The binding of the RuvC protein to the RuvAB complex is thought to cleave the DNA strands, thereby resolving the Holliday junction.

== Protein complex ==
The RuvABC is a complex of three proteins that resolve the Holliday junction formed during bacterial homologous recombination. In Escherichia coli, DNA replication forks stall at least once per cell cycle, so that DNA replication must be restarted if the cell is to survive. Replication restart is a multi-step process in E. coli that requires the sequential action of several proteins. When the progress of the replication fork is impeded, the single-stranded binding protein and RecG helicase along with the RuvABC complex are required for rescue. The resolution of Holliday junctions that accumulate following replication on damaged DNA templates in E. coli requires the RuvABC complex.

=== RuvA ===
RuvA is a DNA-binding protein that binds Holliday junctions with high affinity. The structure of the complex has been variously elucidated through X-ray crystallography and EM data. RuvA forms a tetramer that binds to the Holliday junction and forces it into a planar configuration. In some cases, a second tetramer binds to the opposite face of the DNA, forming a shell around the junction. The RuvA tetramer has acidic pins near its center that facilitate unwinding and contribute to substrate specificity.

=== RuvB ===
RuvB is a DNA-dependent ATPase that forms a hexameric ring around the arms of the Holliday junction. RuvB is thought to pump the DNA through RuvA using the energy generated by the hydrolysis of ATP. This converts the homoduplex DNA into heteroduplex.

=== RuvC ===
RuvC is the resolvase, which cleaves the Holliday junction. RuvC binds to Holliday junctions as a homodimer. As a homodimer, there are two active endonuclease sites, each of which can form a double-strand break. RuvC can be bound to the complex in either orientation, therefore resolving Holliday junctions in either a horizontal or vertical manner. There are multiple theories as to how RuvC is able to access the branch migration complex. One theory is that a RuvA tetramer binds only to one side of the DNA, leaving an exposed face for RuvC to bind to. An alternative theory is that RuvA does not maintain the shell like structure it initially forms around the junction, but rather opens up to allow RuvC to access the DNA.

== See also ==
- RecBCD
