= DNA nanotechnology =

Design and manufacture of artificial nucleic acid structures

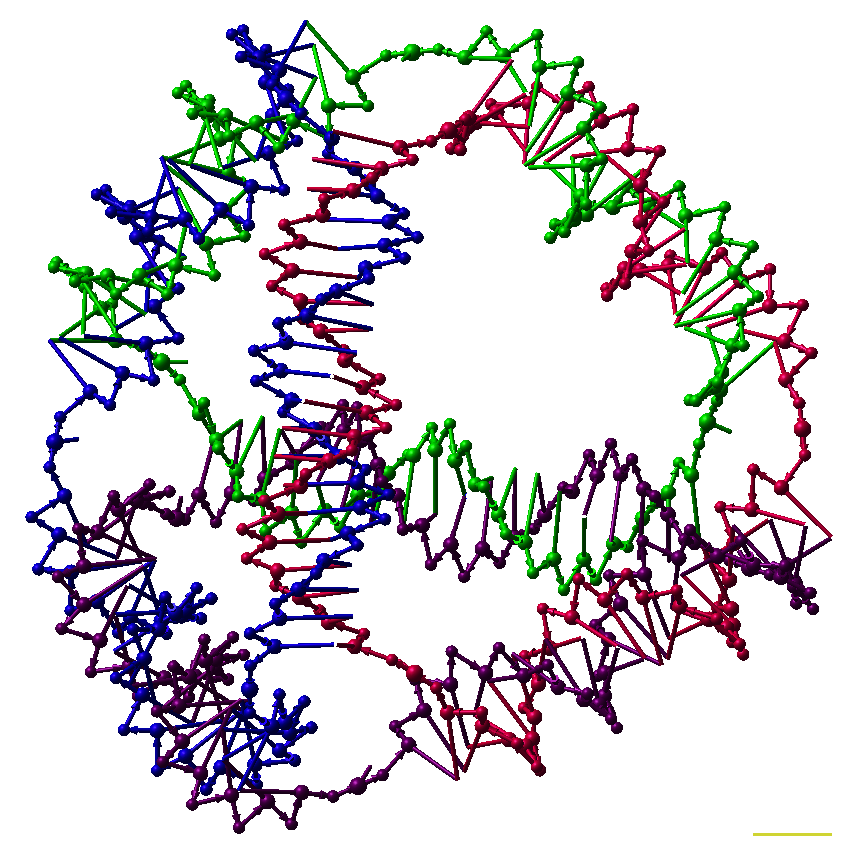
DNA nanotechnology involves forming artificial, designed nanostructures out of nucleic acids, such as this DNA tetrahedron. Each edge of the tetrahedron is a 20 base pair DNA double helix, and each vertex is a three-arm junction. The 4 DNA strands that form the 4 tetrahedral faces are color-coded.

DNA nanotechnology is the design and manufacture of artificial nucleic acid structures for technological uses. In this field, nucleic acids are used as non-biological engineering materials for nanotechnology rather than as the carriers of genetic information in living cells. Researchers in the field have created static structures such as two- and three-dimensional crystal lattices, nanotubes, polyhedra, and arbitrary shapes, and functional devices such as molecular machines and DNA computers. The field is beginning to be used as a tool to solve basic science problems in structural biology and biophysics, including applications in X-ray crystallography and nuclear magnetic resonance spectroscopy of proteins to determine structures. Potential applications in molecular scale electronics and nanomedicine are also being investigated.

The conceptual foundation for DNA nanotechnology was first laid out by Nadrian Seeman in the early 1980s, and the field began to attract widespread interest in the mid-2000s. This use of nucleic acids is enabled by their strict base pairing rules, which cause only portions of strands with complementary base sequences to bind together to form strong, rigid double helix structures. This allows for the rational design of base sequences that will selectively assemble to form complex target structures with precisely controlled nanoscale features. Several assembly methods are used to make these structures, including tile-based structures that assemble from smaller structures, folding structures using the DNA origami method, and dynamically reconfigurable structures using strand displacement methods. The field's name specifically references DNA, but the same principles have been used with other types of nucleic acids as well, leading to the occasional use of the alternative name nucleic acid nanotechnology.

== History ==
The conceptual foundation for DNA nanotechnology was first laid out by Nadrian Seeman in the early 1980s. Seeman's original motivation was to create a three-dimensional DNA lattice for orienting other large molecules, which would simplify their crystallographic study by eliminating the difficult process of obtaining pure crystals. This idea had reportedly come to him in late 1980, after realizing the similarity between the woodcut Depth by M. C. Escher and an array of DNA six-arm junctions. Several natural branched DNA structures were known at the time, including the DNA replication fork and the mobile Holliday junction, but Seeman's insight was that immobile nucleic acid junctions could be created by properly designing the strand sequences to remove symmetry in the assembled molecule, and that these immobile junctions could in principle be combined into rigid crystalline lattices. The first theoretical paper proposing this scheme was published in 1982, and the first experimental demonstration of an immobile DNA junction was published the following year.

The woodcut Depth (pictured) by M. C. Escher reportedly inspired Nadrian Seeman to consider using three-dimensional lattices of DNA to orient hard-to-crystallize molecules. This led to the beginning of the field of DNA nanotechnology.

In 1991, Seeman's laboratory published a report on the synthesis of a cube made of DNA, the first synthetic three-dimensional nucleic acid nanostructure, for which he received the 1995 Feynman Prize in Nanotechnology. This was followed by a DNA truncated octahedron. It soon became clear that these structures, polygonal shapes with flexible junctions as their vertices, were not rigid enough to form extended three-dimensional lattices. Seeman developed the more rigid double-crossover (DX) structural motif, and in 1998, in collaboration with Erik Winfree, published the creation of two-dimensional lattices of DX tiles. These tile-based structures had the advantage that they provided the ability to implement DNA computing, which was demonstrated by Winfree and Paul Rothemund in their 2004 paper on the algorithmic self-assembly of a Sierpinski gasket structure, and for which they shared the 2006 Feynman Prize in Nanotechnology. Winfree's key insight was that the DX tiles could be used as Wang tiles, meaning that their assembly could perform computation. The synthesis of a three-dimensional lattice was finally published by Seeman in 2009, nearly thirty years after he had set out to achieve it.

New abilities continued to be discovered for designed DNA structures throughout the 2000s. The first DNA nanomachine—a motif that changes its structure in response to an input—was demonstrated in 1999 by Seeman. An improved system, which was the first nucleic acid device to make use of toehold-mediated strand displacement, was demonstrated by Bernard Yurke in 2000. The next advance was to translate this into mechanical motion, and in 2004 and 2005, several DNA walker systems were demonstrated by the groups of Seeman, Niles Pierce, Andrew Turberfield, and Chengde Mao. The idea of using DNA arrays to template the assembly of other molecules such as nanoparticles and proteins, first suggested by Bruche Robinson and Seeman in 1987, was demonstrated in 2002 by Seeman, Kiehl et al. and subsequently by many other groups.

In 2006, Rothemund first demonstrated the DNA origami method for easily and robustly forming folded DNA structures of arbitrary shape. Rothemund had conceived of this method as being conceptually intermediate between Seeman's DX lattices, which used many short strands, and William Shih's DNA octahedron, which consisted mostly of one very long strand. Rothemund's DNA origami contains a long strand which folding is assisted by several short strands. This method allowed forming much larger structures than formerly possible, and which are less technically demanding to design and synthesize. DNA origami was the cover story of Nature on March 15, 2006. Rothemund's research demonstrating two-dimensional DNA origami structures was followed by the demonstration of solid three-dimensional DNA origami by Douglas et al. in 2009, while the labs of Jørgen Kjems and Yan demonstrated hollow three-dimensional structures made out of two-dimensional faces.

DNA nanotechnology was initially met with some skepticism due to the unusual non-biological use of nucleic acids as materials for building structures and doing computation, and the preponderance of proof of principle experiments that extended the abilities of the field but were far from actual applications. Seeman's 1991 paper on the synthesis of the DNA cube was rejected by the journal Science after one reviewer praised its originality while another criticized it for its lack of biological relevance. By the early 2010s the field was considered to have increased its abilities to the point that applications for basic science research were beginning to be realized, and practical applications in medicine and other fields were beginning to be considered feasible. The field had grown from very few active laboratories in 2001 to at least 60 in 2010, which increased the talent pool and thus the number of scientific advances in the field during that decade.

== Fundamental concepts ==
These four strands associate into a DNA four-arm junction because this structure maximizes the number of correct base pairs, with A matched to T and C matched to G. See this image for a more realistic model of the four-arm junction showing its tertiary structure.

This double-crossover (DX) supramolecular complex consists of five DNA single strands that form two double-helical domains, on the top and the bottom in this image. There are two crossover points where the strands cross from one domain into the other.

=== Properties of nucleic acids ===
Nanotechnology is often defined as the study of materials and devices with features on a scale below 100 nanometers. DNA nanotechnology, specifically, is an example of bottom-up molecular self-assembly, in which molecular components spontaneously organize into stable structures; the particular form of these structures is induced by the physical and chemical properties of the components selected by the designers. In DNA nanotechnology, the component materials are strands of nucleic acids such as DNA; these strands are often synthetic and are almost always used outside the context of a living cell. DNA is well-suited to nanoscale construction because the binding between two nucleic acid strands depends on simple base pairing rules which are well understood, and form the specific nanoscale structure of the nucleic acid double helix. These qualities make the assembly of nucleic acid structures easy to control through nucleic acid design. This property is absent in other materials used in nanotechnology, including proteins, for which protein design is very difficult, and nanoparticles, which lack the capability for specific assembly on their own.

The structure of a nucleic acid molecule consists of a sequence of nucleotides distinguished by which nucleobase they contain. In DNA, the four bases present are adenine (A), cytosine (C), guanine (G), and thymine (T). Nucleic acids have the property that two molecules will only bind to each other to form a double helix if the two sequences are complementary, meaning that they form matching sequences of base pairs, with A only binding to T, and C only to G. Because the formation of correctly matched base pairs is energetically favorable, nucleic acid strands are expected in most cases to bind to each other in the conformation that maximizes the number of correctly paired bases. The sequences of bases in a system of strands thus determine the pattern of binding and the overall structure in an easily controllable way. In DNA nanotechnology, the base sequences of strands are rationally designed by researchers so that the base pairing interactions cause the strands to assemble in the desired conformation. While DNA is the dominant material used, structures incorporating other nucleic acids such as RNA and peptide nucleic acid (PNA) have also been constructed.

=== Subfields ===
DNA nanotechnology is sometimes divided into two overlapping subfields: structural DNA nanotechnology and dynamic DNA nanotechnology. Structural DNA nanotechnology, sometimes abbreviated as SDN, focuses on synthesizing and characterizing nucleic acid complexes and materials that assemble into a static, equilibrium end state. On the other hand, dynamic DNA nanotechnology focuses on complexes with useful non-equilibrium behavior such as the ability to reconfigure based on a chemical or physical stimulus. Some complexes, such as nucleic acid nanomechanical devices, combine features of both the structural and dynamic subfields.

The complexes constructed in structural DNA nanotechnology use topologically branched nucleic acid structures containing junctions. (In contrast, most biological DNA exists as an unbranched double helix.) One of the simplest branched structures is a four-arm junction that consists of four individual DNA strands, portions of which are complementary in a specific pattern. Unlike in natural Holliday junctions, each arm in the artificial immobile four-arm junction has a different base sequence, causing the junction point to be fixed at a certain position. Multiple junctions can be combined in the same complex, such as in the widely used double-crossover (DX) structural motif, which contains two parallel double helical domains with individual strands crossing between the domains at two crossover points. Each crossover point is, topologically, a four-arm junction, but is constrained to one orientation, in contrast to the flexible single four-arm junction, providing a rigidity that makes the DX motif suitable as a structural building block for larger DNA complexes.

Dynamic DNA nanotechnology uses a mechanism called toehold-mediated strand displacement to allow the nucleic acid complexes to reconfigure in response to the addition of a new nucleic acid strand. In this reaction, the incoming strand binds to a single-stranded toehold region of a double-stranded complex, and then displaces one of the strands bound in the original complex through a branch migration process. The overall effect is that one of the strands in the complex is replaced with another one. In addition, reconfigurable structures and devices can be made using functional nucleic acids such as deoxyribozymes and ribozymes, which can perform chemical reactions, and aptamers, which can bind to specific proteins or small molecules.

== Structural DNA nanotechnology ==
Structural DNA nanotechnology, sometimes abbreviated as SDN, focuses on synthesizing and characterizing nucleic acid complexes and materials where the assembly has a static, equilibrium endpoint. The nucleic acid double helix has a robust, defined three-dimensional geometry that makes it possible to simulate, predict and design the structures of more complicated nucleic acid complexes. Many such structures have been created, including two- and three-dimensional structures, and periodic, aperiodic, and discrete structures.

=== Extended lattices ===
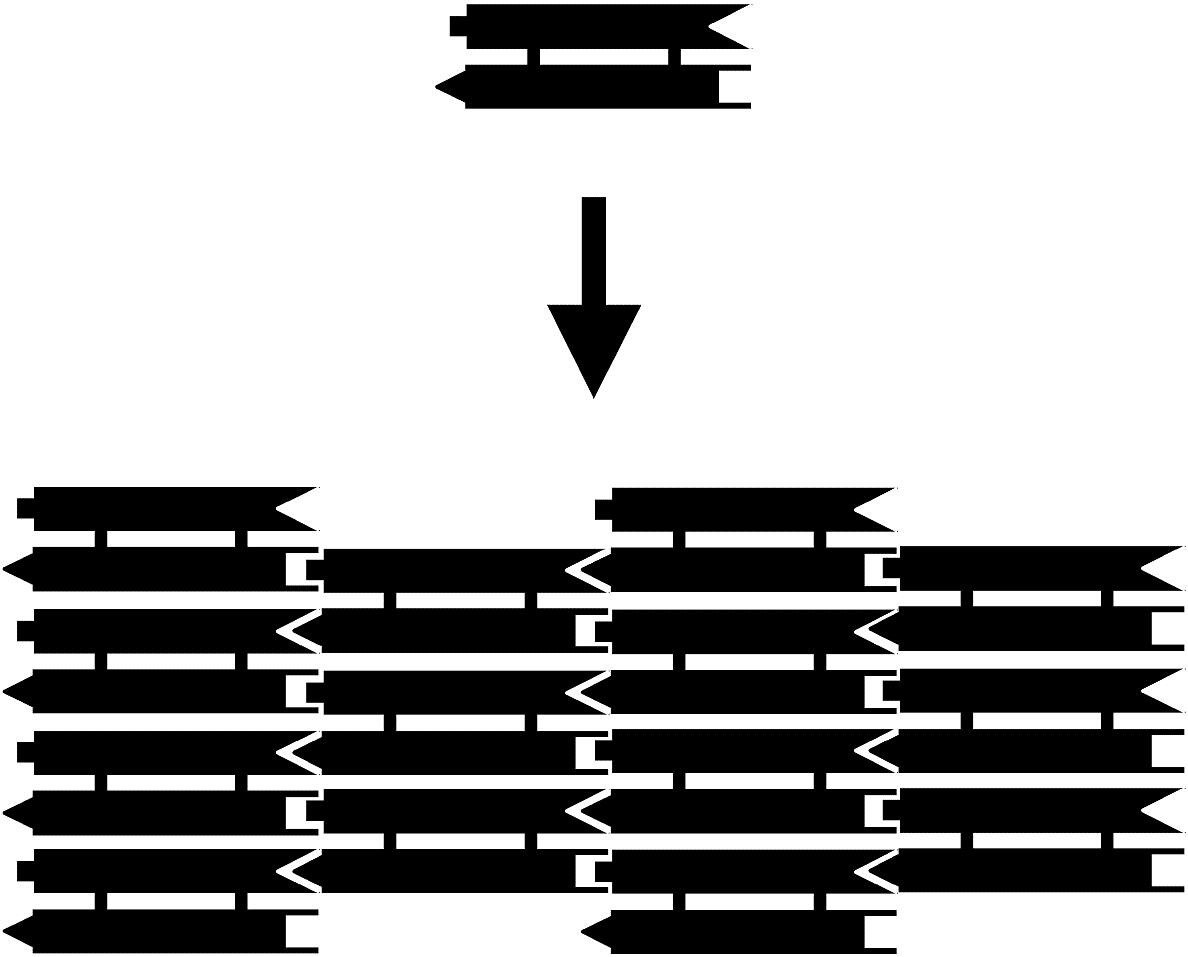
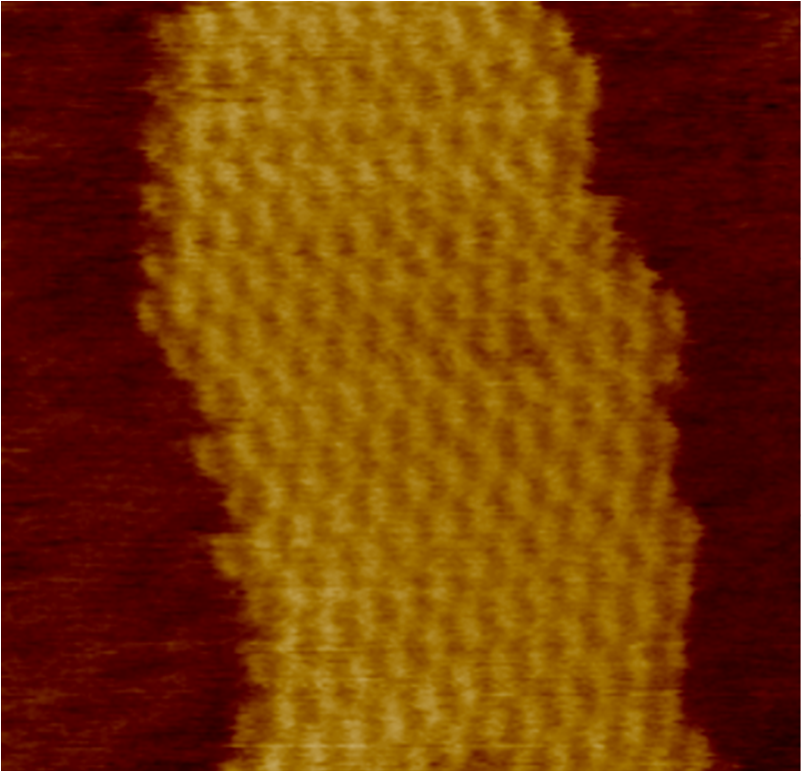
The assembly of a DX array. Left, schematic diagram. Each bar represents a double-helical domain of DNA, with the shapes representing complementary sticky ends. The DX complex at top will combine with other DX complexes into the two-dimensional array shown at bottom. Right, an atomic force microscopy image of the assembled array. The individual DX tiles are clearly visible within the assembled structure. The field is 150 nm across.

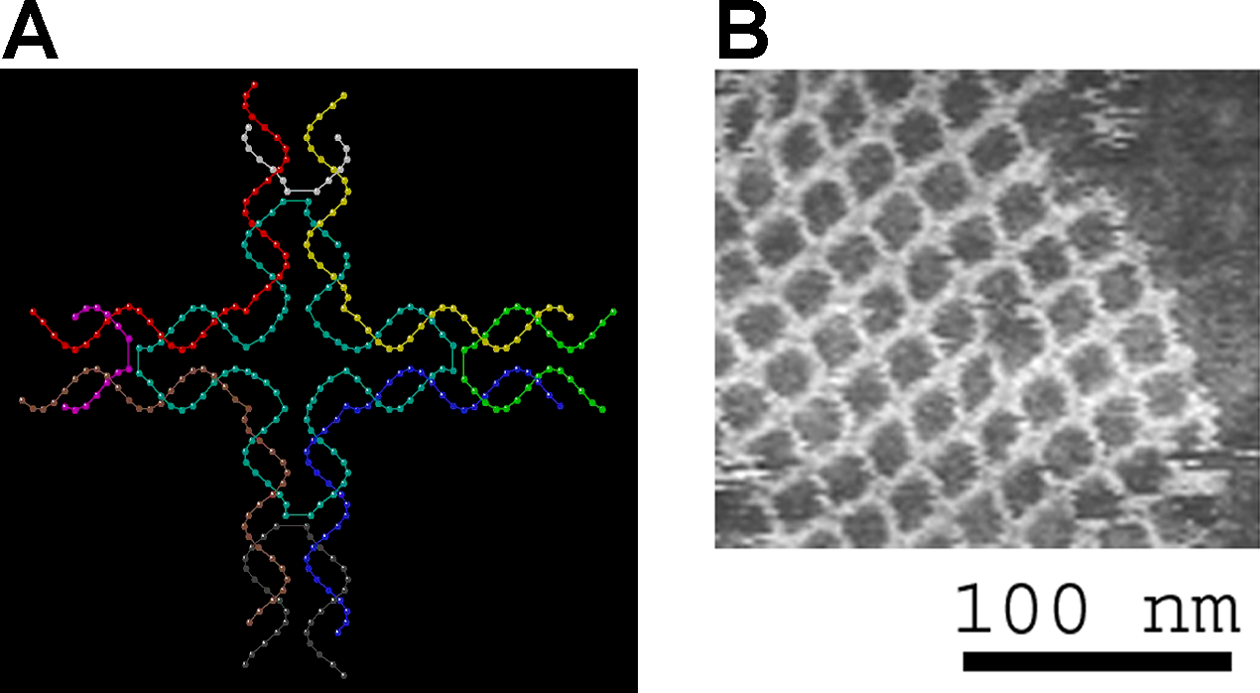
Left, a model of a DNA tile used to make another two-dimensional periodic lattice. Right, an atomic force micrograph of the assembled lattice.

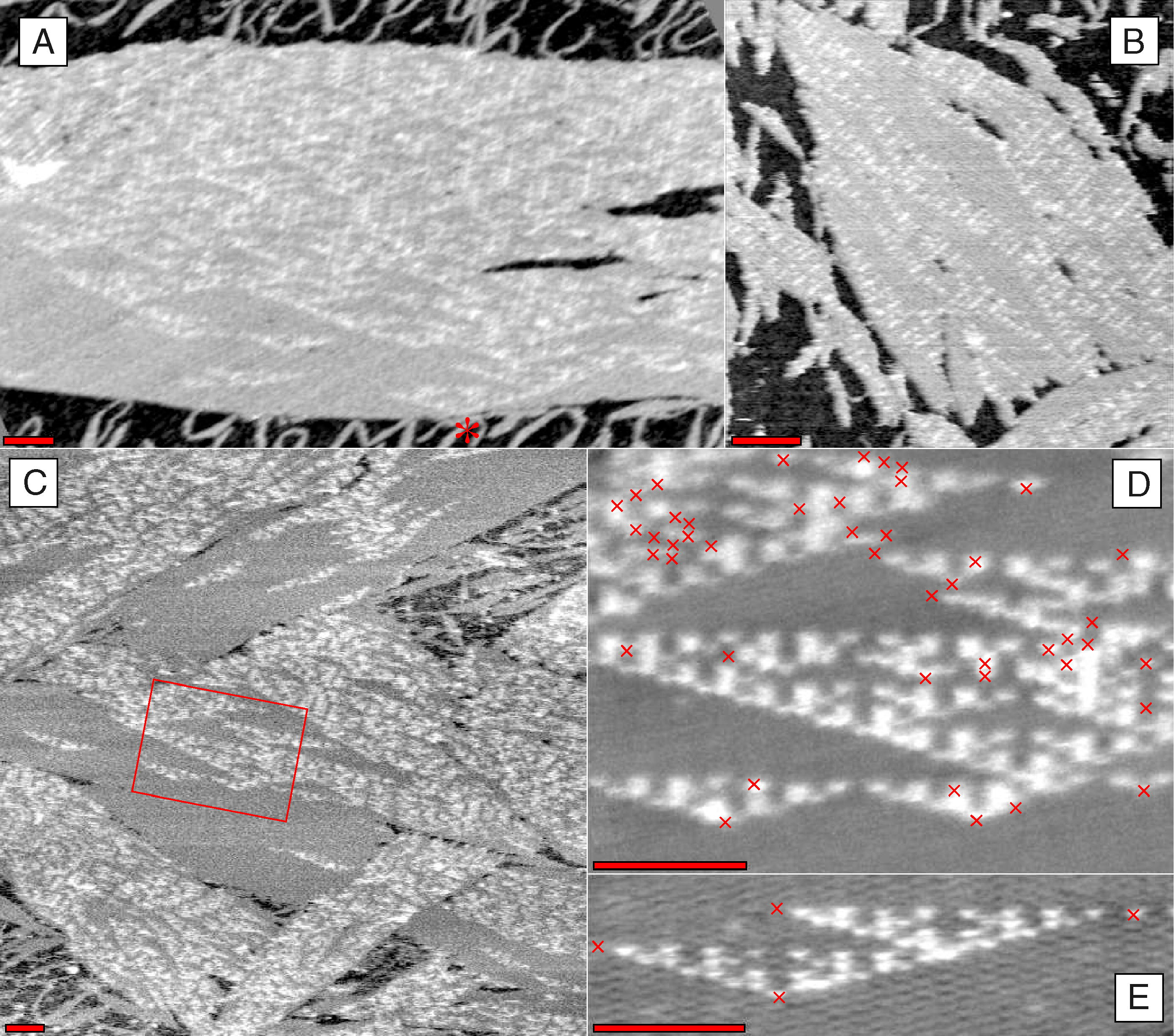
An example of an aperiodic two-dimensional lattice that assembles into a fractal pattern. Left, the Sierpinski gasket fractal. Right, DNA arrays that display a representation of the Sierpinski gasket on their surfaces

Small nucleic acid complexes can be equipped with sticky ends and combined into larger two-dimensional periodic lattices containing a specific tessellated pattern of the individual molecular tiles. The earliest example of this used double-crossover (DX) complexes as the basic tiles, each containing four sticky ends designed with sequences that caused the DX units to combine into periodic two-dimensional flat sheets that are essentially rigid two-dimensional crystals of DNA. Two-dimensional arrays have been made from other motifs as well, including the Holliday junction rhombus lattice, and various DX-based arrays making use of a double-cohesion scheme. The top two images at right show examples of tile-based periodic lattices.

Two-dimensional arrays can be made to exhibit aperiodic structures whose assembly implements a specific algorithm, exhibiting one form of DNA computing. The DX tiles can have their sticky end sequences chosen so that they act as Wang tiles, allowing them to perform computation. A DX array whose assembly encodes an XOR operation has been demonstrated; this allows the DNA array to implement a cellular automaton that generates a fractal known as the Sierpinski gasket. The third image at right shows this type of array. Another system has the function of a binary counter, displaying a representation of increasing binary numbers as it grows. These results show that computation can be incorporated into the assembly of DNA arrays.

DX arrays have been made to form hollow nanotubes 4–20 nm in diameter, essentially two-dimensional lattices which curve back upon themselves. These DNA nanotubes are somewhat similar in size and shape to carbon nanotubes, and while they lack the electrical conductance of carbon nanotubes, DNA nanotubes are more easily modified and connected to other structures. One of many schemes for constructing DNA nanotubes uses a lattice of curved DX tiles that curls around itself and closes into a tube. In an alternative method that allows the circumference to be specified in a simple, modular fashion using single-stranded tiles, the rigidity of the tube is an emergent property.

Forming three-dimensional lattices of DNA was the earliest goal of DNA nanotechnology, but this proved to be one of the most difficult to realize. Success using a motif based on the concept of tensegrity, a balance between tension and compression forces, was finally reported in 2009.

=== Discrete structures ===
Researchers have synthesized many three-dimensional DNA complexes that each have the connectivity of a polyhedron, such as a cube or octahedron, meaning that the DNA duplexes trace the edges of a polyhedron with a DNA junction at each vertex. The earliest demonstrations of DNA polyhedra were very work-intensive, requiring multiple ligations and solid-phase synthesis steps to create catenated polyhedra. Subsequent work yielded polyhedra whose synthesis was much easier. These include a DNA octahedron made from a long single strand designed to fold into the correct conformation, and a tetrahedron that can be produced from four DNA strands in one step, pictured at the top of this article.

Nanostructures of arbitrary, non-regular shapes are usually made using the DNA origami method. These structures consist of a long, natural virus strand as a "scaffold", which is made to fold into the desired shape by computationally designed short "staple" strands. This method has the advantages of being easy to design, as the base sequence is predetermined by the scaffold strand sequence, and not requiring high strand purity and accurate stoichiometry, as most other DNA nanotechnology methods do. DNA origami was first demonstrated for two-dimensional shapes, such as a smiley face, a coarse map of the Western Hemisphere, and the Mona Lisa painting. Solid three-dimensional structures can be made by using parallel DNA helices arranged in a honeycomb pattern, and structures with two-dimensional faces can be made to fold into a hollow overall three-dimensional shape, akin to a cardboard box. These can be programmed to open and reveal or release a molecular cargo in response to a stimulus, making them potentially useful as programmable molecular cages.

=== Templated assembly ===
Nucleic acid structures can be made to incorporate molecules other than nucleic acids, sometimes called heteroelements, including proteins, metallic nanoparticles, quantum dots, amines, and fullerenes. This allows the construction of materials and devices with a range of functionalities much greater than is possible with nucleic acids alone. The goal is to use the self-assembly of the nucleic acid structures to template the assembly of the nanoparticles hosted on them, controlling their position and in some cases orientation. Many of these schemes use a covalent attachment scheme, using oligonucleotides with amide or thiol functional groups as a chemical handle to bind the heteroelements. This covalent binding scheme has been used to arrange gold nanoparticles on a DX-based array, and to arrange streptavidin protein molecules into specific patterns on a DX array. A non-covalent hosting scheme using Dervan polyamides on a DX array was used to arrange streptavidin proteins in a specific pattern on a DX array. Carbon nanotubes have been hosted on DNA arrays in a pattern allowing the assembly to act as a molecular electronic device, a carbon nanotube field-effect transistor. In addition, there are nucleic acid metallization methods, in which the nucleic acid is replaced by a metal which assumes the general shape of the original nucleic acid structure, and schemes for using nucleic acid nanostructures as lithography masks, transferring their pattern into a solid surface.

== Dynamic DNA nanotechnology ==
Dynamic DNA nanotechnology often makes use of toehold-mediated strand displacement reactions. In this example, the red strand binds to the single stranded toehold region on the green strand (region 1), and then in a branch migration process across region 2, the blue strand is displaced and freed from the complex. Reactions like these are used to dynamically reconfigure or assemble nucleic acid nanostructures. In addition, the red and blue strands can be used as signals in a molecular logic gate.

Dynamic DNA nanotechnology focuses on forming nucleic acid systems with designed dynamic functionalities related to their overall structures, such as computation and mechanical motion. There is some overlap between structural and dynamic DNA nanotechnology, as structures can be formed through annealing and then reconfigured dynamically, or can be made to form dynamically in the first place.

=== Nanomechanical devices ===
DNA complexes have been made that change their conformation upon some stimulus, making them one form of nanorobotics. These structures are initially formed in the same way as the static structures made in structural DNA nanotechnology, but are designed so that dynamic reconfiguration is possible after the initial assembly. The earliest such device made use of the transition between the B-DNA and Z-DNA forms to respond to a change in buffer conditions by undergoing a twisting motion. This reliance on buffer conditions caused all devices to change state at the same time. Subsequent systems could change states based upon the presence of control strands, allowing multiple devices to be independently operated in solution. Some examples of such systems are a "molecular tweezers" design that has an open and a closed state, a device that could switch from a paranemic-crossover (PX) conformation to a (JX2) conformation with two non-junction juxtapositions of the DNA backbone, undergoing rotational motion in the process, and a two-dimensional array that could dynamically expand and contract in response to control strands. Structures have also been made that dynamically open or close, potentially acting as a molecular cage to release or reveal a functional cargo upon opening. In another example, a DNA origami nanostructure was coupled to T7 RNA polymerase and could thus be operated as a chemical energy-driven motor that can be coupled to a passive follower, which it then drives.

Photoresponsive DNA assemblies have also been used to control micron-scale condensate motion. In 2025, Udono, Nomura, and Takinoue reported azobenzene-modified DNA condensates whose binding state and fluidity could be switched by ultraviolet and visible light, producing reversible and directional motions.

DNA walkers are a class of nucleic acid nanomachines that exhibit directional motion along a linear track. A large number of schemes have been demonstrated. One strategy is to control the motion of the walker along the track using control strands that need to be manually added in sequence. It is also possible to control individual steps of a DNA walker by irradiation with light of different wavelengths. Another approach is to make use of restriction enzymes or deoxyribozymes to cleave the strands and cause the walker to move forward, which has the advantage of running autonomously. A later system could walk upon a two-dimensional surface rather than a linear track, and demonstrated the ability to selectively pick up and move molecular cargo. In 2018, a catenated DNA that uses rolling circle transcription by an attached T7 RNA polymerase was shown to walk along a DNA-path, guided by the generated RNA strand. Additionally, a linear walker has been demonstrated that performs DNA-templated synthesis as the walker advances along the track, allowing autonomous multistep chemical synthesis directed by the walker. The synthetic DNA walkers' function is similar to that of the proteins dynein and kinesin.

=== Strand displacement cascades ===
Cascades of strand displacement reactions can be used for either computational or structural purposes. An individual strand displacement reaction involves revealing a new sequence in response to the presence of some initiator strand. Many such reactions can be linked into a cascade where the newly revealed output sequence of one reaction can initiate another strand displacement reaction elsewhere. This in turn allows for the construction of chemical reaction networks with many components, exhibiting complex computational and information processing abilities. These cascades are made energetically favorable through the formation of new base pairs, and the entropy gain from disassembly reactions. Strand displacement cascades allow isothermal operation of the assembly or computational process, in contrast to traditional nucleic acid assembly's requirement for a thermal annealing step, where the temperature is raised and then slowly lowered to ensure proper formation of the desired structure. They can also support catalytic function of the initiator species, where less than one equivalent of the initiator can cause the reaction to go to completion.

Strand displacement complexes can be used to make molecular logic gates capable of complex computation. Unlike traditional electronic computers, which use electric current as inputs and outputs, molecular computers use the concentrations of specific chemical species as signals. In the case of nucleic acid strand displacement circuits, the signal is the presence of nucleic acid strands that are released or consumed by binding and unbinding events to other strands in displacement complexes. This approach has been used to make logic gates such as AND, OR, and NOT gates. More recently, a four-bit circuit was demonstrated that can compute the square root of the integers 0–15, using a system of gates containing 130 DNA strands.

Another use of strand displacement cascades is to make dynamically assembled structures. These use a hairpin structure for the reactants, so that when the input strand binds, the newly revealed sequence is on the same molecule rather than disassembling. This allows new opened hairpins to be added to a growing complex. This approach has been used to make simple structures such as three- and four-arm junctions and dendrimers.

== Applications ==
DNA nanotechnology provides one of the few ways to form designed, complex structures with precise control over nanoscale features. The field is beginning to see application to solve basic science problems in structural biology and biophysics. The earliest such application envisaged for the field, and one still in development, is in crystallography, where molecules that are difficult to crystallize in isolation could be arranged within a three-dimensional nucleic acid lattice, allowing determination of their structure. Another application is the use of DNA origami rods to replace liquid crystals in residual dipolar coupling experiments in protein NMR spectroscopy; using DNA origami is advantageous because, unlike liquid crystals, they are tolerant of the detergents needed to suspend membrane proteins in solution. DNA walkers have been used as nanoscale assembly lines to move nanoparticles and direct chemical synthesis. Further, DNA origami structures have aided in the biophysical studies of enzyme function and protein folding.

DNA nanotechnology is moving toward potential real-world applications. The ability of nucleic acid arrays to arrange other molecules indicates its potential applications in molecular scale electronics. The assembly of a nucleic acid structure could be used to template the assembly of molecular electronic elements such as molecular wires, providing a method for nanometer-scale control of the placement and overall architecture of the device analogous to a molecular breadboard. DNA nanotechnology has been compared to the concept of programmable matter because of the coupling of computation to its material properties.

In a study conducted by a group of scientists from iNANO and CDNA centers in Aarhus University, researchers were able to construct a small multi-switchable 3D DNA Box Origami. The proposed nanoparticle was characterized by atomic force microscopy (AFM), transmission electron microscopy (TEM) and Förster resonance energy transfer (FRET). The constructed box was shown to have a unique reclosing mechanism, which enabled it to repeatedly open and close in response to a unique set of DNA or RNA keys. The authors proposed that this "DNA device can potentially be used for a broad range of applications such as controlling the function of single molecules, controlled drug delivery, and molecular computing."

There are potential applications for DNA nanotechnology in nanomedicine, making use of its ability to perform computation in a biocompatible format to make "smart drugs" for targeted drug delivery, as well as for diagnostic applications. One such system being investigated uses a hollow DNA box containing proteins that induce apoptosis, or cell death, that will only open when in proximity to a cancer cell. There has additionally been interest in expressing these artificial structures in engineered living bacterial cells, most likely using the transcribed RNA for the assembly, although it is unknown whether these complex structures are able to efficiently fold or assemble in the cell's cytoplasm. If successful, this could enable directed evolution of nucleic acid nanostructures. Scientists at Oxford University reported the self-assembly of four short strands of synthetic DNA into a cage which can enter cells and survive for at least 48 hours. The fluorescently labeled DNA tetrahedra were found to remain intact in the laboratory cultured human kidney cells despite the attack by cellular enzymes after two days. This experiment showed the potential of drug delivery inside the living cells using the DNA 'cage'. A DNA tetrahedron was used to deliver RNA Interference (RNAi) in a mouse model, reported a team of researchers in MIT. Delivery of the interfering RNA for treatment has showed some success using polymer or lipid, but there are limits of safety and imprecise targeting, in addition to short shelf life in the blood stream. The DNA nanostructure created by the team consists of six strands of DNA to form a tetrahedron, with one strand of RNA affixed to each of the six edges. The tetrahedron is further equipped with targeting protein, three folate molecules, which lead the DNA nanoparticles to the abundant folate receptors found on some tumors. The result showed that the gene expression targeted by the RNAi, luciferase, dropped by more than half. This study shows promise in using DNA nanotechnology as an effective tool to deliver treatment using the emerging RNA Interference technology. The DNA tetrahedron was also used in an effort to overcome the phenomena multidrug resistance. Doxorubicin (DOX) was conjugated with the tetrahedron and was loaded into MCF-7 breast cancer cells that contained the P-glycoprotein drug efflux pump. The results of the experiment showed the DOX was not being pumped out and apoptosis of the cancer cells was achieved. The tetrahedron without DOX was loaded into cells to test its biocompatibility, and the structure showed no cytotoxicity itself. The DNA tetrahedron was also used as barcode for profiling the subcellular expression and distribution of proteins in cells for diagnostic purposes. The tetrahedral-nanostructured showed enhanced signal due to higher labeling efficiency and stability.

Applications for DNA nanotechnology in nanomedicine also focus on mimicking the structure and function of naturally occurring membrane proteins with designed DNA nanostructures. In 2012, Langecker et al. introduced a pore-shaped DNA origami structure that can self-insert into lipid membranes via hydrophobic cholesterol modifications and induce ionic currents across the membrane. This first demonstration of a synthetic DNA ion channel was followed by a variety of pore-inducing designs ranging from a single DNA duplex, to small tile-based structures, and large DNA origami transmembrane porins. Similar to naturally occurring protein ion channels, this ensemble of synthetic DNA-made counterparts thereby spans multiple orders of magnitude in conductance. The study of the membrane-inserting single DNA duplex showed that current must also flow on the DNA-lipid interface as no central channel lumen is present in the design that lets ions pass across the lipid bilayer. This indicated that the DNA-induced lipid pore has a toroidal shape, rather than cylindrical, as lipid headgroups reorient to face towards the membrane-inserted part of the DNA. Researchers from the University of Cambridge and the University of Illinois at Urbana-Champaign then demonstrated that such a DNA-induced toroidal pore can facilitate rapid lipid flip-flop between the lipid bilayer leaflets. Utilizing this effect, they designed a synthetic DNA-built enzyme that flips lipids in biological membranes orders of magnitudes faster than naturally occurring proteins called scramblases. This development highlights the potential of synthetic DNA nanostructures for personalized drugs and therapeutics.

== Design ==
DNA nanostructures must be rationally designed so that individual nucleic acid strands will assemble into the desired structures. This process usually begins with specification of a desired target structure or function. Then, the overall secondary structure of the target complex is determined, specifying the arrangement of nucleic acid strands within the structure, and which portions of those strands should be bound to each other. The last step is the primary structure design, which is the specification of the actual base sequences of each nucleic acid strand.

=== Structural design ===
The first step in designing a nucleic acid nanostructure is to decide how a given structure should be represented by a specific arrangement of nucleic acid strands. This design step determines the secondary structure, or the positions of the base pairs that hold the individual strands together in the desired shape. Several approaches have been demonstrated:

- Tile-based structures. This approach breaks the target structure into smaller units with strong binding between the strands contained in each unit, and weaker interactions between the units. It is often used to make periodic lattices, but can also be used to implement algorithmic self-assembly, making them a platform for DNA computing. This was the dominant design strategy used from the mid-1990s until the mid-2000s, when the DNA origami methodology was developed.
- Folding structures. An alternative to the tile-based approach, folding approaches make the nanostructure from one long strand, which can either have a designed sequence that folds due to its interactions with itself, or it can be folded into the desired shape by using shorter, "staple" strands. This latter method is called DNA origami, which allows forming nanoscale two- and three-dimensional shapes (see Discrete structures above).
- Dynamic assembly. This approach directly controls the kinetics of DNA self-assembly, specifying all of the intermediate steps in the reaction mechanism in addition to the final product. This is done using starting materials which adopt a hairpin structure; these then assemble into the final conformation in a cascade reaction, in a specific order (see Strand displacement cascades below). This approach has the advantage of proceeding isothermally, at a constant temperature. This is in contrast to the thermodynamic approaches, which require a thermal annealing step where a temperature change is required to trigger the assembly and favor proper formation of the desired structure.

=== Sequence design ===
After any of the above approaches are used to design the secondary structure of a target complex, an actual sequence of nucleotides that will form into the desired structure must be devised. Nucleic acid design is the process of assigning a specific nucleic acid base sequence to each of a structure's constituent strands so that they will associate into a desired conformation. Most methods have the goal of designing sequences so that the target structure has the lowest energy, and is thus the most thermodynamically favorable, while incorrectly assembled structures have higher energies and are thus disfavored. This is done either through simple, faster heuristic methods such as sequence symmetry minimization, or by using a full nearest-neighbor thermodynamic model, which is more accurate but slower and more computationally intensive. Geometric models are used to examine tertiary structure of the nanostructures and to ensure that the complexes are not overly strained.

Nucleic acid design has similar goals to protein design. In both, the sequence of monomers is designed to favor the desired target structure and to disfavor other structures. Nucleic acid design has the advantage of being much computationally easier than protein design, because the simple base pairing rules are sufficient to predict a structure's energetic favorability, and detailed information about the overall three-dimensional folding of the structure is not required. This allows the use of simple heuristic methods that yield experimentally robust designs. Nucleic acid structures are less versatile than proteins in their function because of proteins' increased ability to fold into complex structures, and the limited chemical diversity of the four nucleotides as compared to the twenty proteinogenic amino acids.

== Materials and methods ==
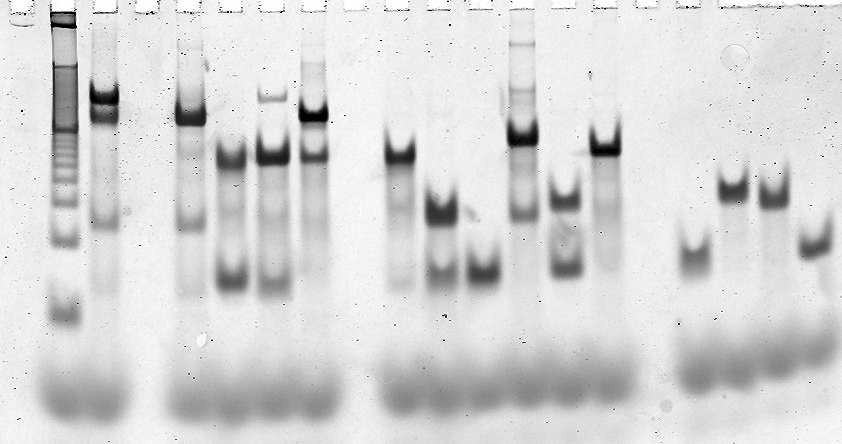
Gel electrophoresis methods, such as this formation assay on a DX complex, are used to ascertain whether the desired structures are forming properly. Each vertical lane contains a series of bands, where each band is characteristic of a particular reaction intermediate.

The sequences of the DNA strands making up a target structure are designed computationally, using molecular modeling and thermodynamic modeling software. The nucleic acids themselves are then synthesized using standard oligonucleotide synthesis methods, usually automated in an oligonucleotide synthesizer, and strands of custom sequences are commercially available. Strands can be purified by denaturing gel electrophoresis if needed, and precise concentrations determined via any of several nucleic acid quantitation methods using ultraviolet absorbance spectroscopy.

The fully formed target structures can be verified using native gel electrophoresis, which gives size and shape information for the nucleic acid complexes. An electrophoretic mobility shift assay can assess whether a structure incorporates all desired strands. Fluorescent labeling and Förster resonance energy transfer (FRET) are sometimes used to characterize the structure of the complexes.

Nucleic acid structures can be directly imaged by atomic force microscopy, which is well suited to extended two-dimensional structures, but less useful for discrete three-dimensional structures because of the microscope tip's interaction with the fragile nucleic acid structure; transmission electron microscopy and cryo-electron microscopy are often used in this case. Extended three-dimensional lattices are analyzed by X-ray crystallography.

== See also ==
- International Society for Nanoscale Science, Computation, and Engineering
- Comparison of nucleic acid simulation software
- Molecular models of DNA
- Nanobiotechnology
