= MIF4GD =

Protein-coding gene in the species Homo sapiens

Identifiers
- Aliases: MIF4GD, AD023, MIFD, SLIP1, MIF4G domain containing
- External IDs: OMIM: 612072; MGI: 1916924; GeneCards: MIF4GD

Gene location (Human)
Chr.	Chromosome 17 (human)
Band	17q25.1	Start	75,266,228 bp
Band	17q25.1	End	75,271,231 bp

Gene location (Mouse)
Chr.	Chromosome 11 (mouse)
Band	11|11 E2	Start	115,498,744 bp
Band	11|11 E2	End	115,503,795 bp
RNA expression pattern
Bgee	Human / Mouse (ortholog); Top expressed in: skin of arm; saphenous vein; granulocyte; nipple; gastrocnemius muscle; human penis; tibialis anterior muscle; superior surface of tongue; tibial arteries; internal globus pallidus / Top expressed in: spermatocyte; spermatid; seminiferous tubule; lip; neural layer of retina; right kidney; brown adipose tissue; subcutaneous adipose tissue; thymus; spleen; More reference expression data
BioGPS	n/a
Gene ontology
Molecular function	protein C-terminus binding; protein binding; RNA binding; translation activator activity; identical protein binding
Cellular component	nucleolus; nucleus; cytoplasm; cytosol
Biological process	regulation of translation; regulation of translational initiation; positive regulation of translation
Sources:Amigo / QuickGO
Orthologs
Databases	NCBI: entry; OMA: entry
Species	Human	Mouse
Entrez	57409	69674
Ensembl	ENSG00000125457	ENSMUSG00000020743
UniProt	A9UHW6	Q3UBZ5
RefSeq (mRNA)	NM_001242498; NM_001242500; NM_001242501; NM_020679; NM_001363806 NM_001365751; NM_001365752; NM_001365753; NM_001365754; NM_001365755; NM_001370592	NM_001243584; NM_001243586; NM_001243587; NM_027162
RefSeq (protein)	NP_001229427; NP_001229429; NP_001229430; NP_065730; NP_001350735 NP_001352680; NP_001352681; NP_001352682; NP_001352683; NP_001352684; NP_001357521	NP_001230513; NP_001230515; NP_001230516; NP_081438
Location (UCSC)	Chr 17: 75.27 – 75.27 Mb	Chr 11: 115.5 – 115.5 Mb
PubMed search
- Wikidata
View/Edit Human	View/Edit Mouse

MIF4GD, or MIF4G domain-containing protein, is a protein which in humans is encoded by the MIF4GD gene. It is also known as SLIP1, SLBP (Stem-Loop Binding Protein)-interacting protein 1, AD023, and MIFD. MIF4GD is expressed ubiquitously in humans, and has been found to be involved in activating proteins for histone mRNA translation, alternative splicing and translation of mRNAs, and is a factor in the regulation of cell proliferation.

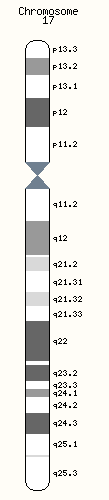
MIF4GD is located on human chromosome 17q25.1 (second white band from bottom).

== Gene ==
The MIF4GD gene is located in humans on the minus strand of chromosome 17q25.1, and spans 5.0 Kb, from bases 75,266,228 to 75,271,292.

== mRNA ==
There are 11 alternatively-spliced mRNA transcripts and 3 unspliced mRNA transcripts that can be transcribed from this gene, which include 7 possible exons and 11 distinct introns.

== Protein ==
There are 10 viable isoforms of the MIF4G domain-containing protein. The longest isoform is MIF4G domain-containing protein isoform 1, which is 263 amino acids long, however, the most common isoform is MIF4G domain-containing protein isoform 4, which consists of 6 exons and is 222 amino acids in length.

=== Features ===
MIF4G domain-containing protein isoform 1 has a predicted molecular weight of 30.1 kDa, and a predicted isoelectric point of 5.2, indicating that it is an acidic protein. It has a normal ratio of each amino acid when compared to the average human protein. Additionally, MIF4GD is expected to form 11 alpha helices.

=== Sub-cellular localization ===
Searches of MIF4GD antibodies showed that MIF4GD is present in the cytoplasm and nucleoli of cells. Additionally, several bioinformatic programs predict human MIF4GD, as well as several of its orthologs, are present in the cytoplasm, nucleus and mitochondria of cells.

=== Post-translational modifications ===
Schematic drawing of MIF4GD protein. MIF4G domain and predicted low complexity domains are shown, as well as predicted phosphorylation sites (red), and other post-translational modification sites, including acetylation and OGlcNAc sites (gray).

Due to its presumed localization in the cytoplasm, it is predicted that MIF4GD could be phosphorylated, acetylated, ubiquitinated, or sumoylated. Additionally, MIF4GD is predicted to contain a "YinOYang" site at S61, which may be either O-GlcNAcylated or phosphorylated at different times for regulatory purposes. It is not likely that the MIF4GD protein will be lipid-linked or glycosylated.

=== MIF4G domain ===
The MIF4GD protein that contains an MIF4G domain, which is named after the middle domain of eukaryotic initiation factor 4G (eIF4G).

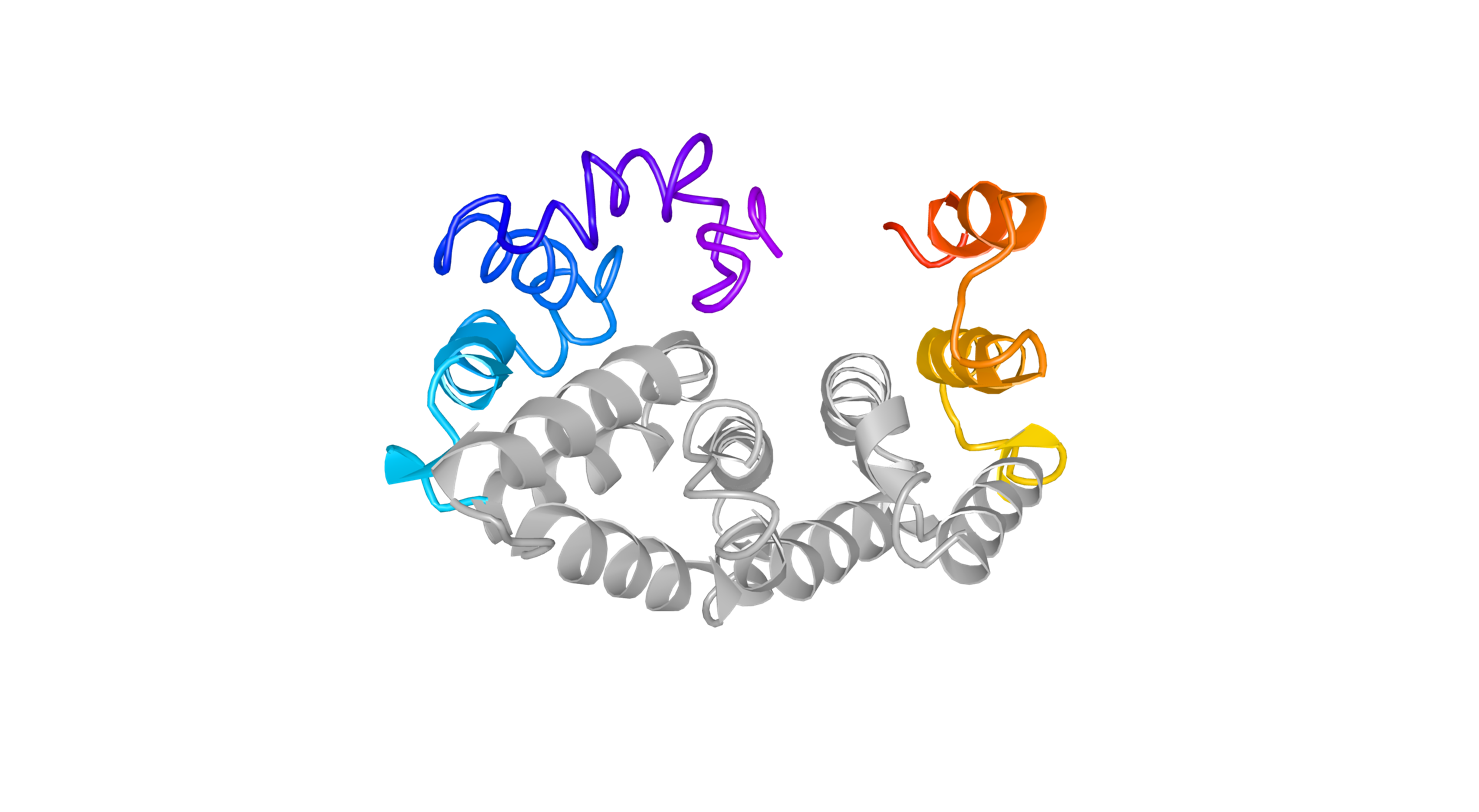
The predicted tertiary structure of MIF4GD by I-TASSER program. The MIF4G domain is colored gray, the N-terminus is located on the left in purple, and the C-terminus is on the right colored in red.

The MIF4G domain of the MIF4GD protein has a molecular weight of 17.0 kDa, and has a predicted isoelectric point of 5.7. Similar to the entire protein, it contains normal ratios of each amino acid relative to a reference of human proteins, however, it contains less negatively-charged amino acids and more positively-charged amino acids relative to the entire protein. The MIF4G domain is predicted to contain many alpha-helices and is thought to contain alpha-helical repeats.

== Expression and regulation ==
MIF4GD is found only in animals, and is expressed ubiquitously in the body, though it has been discovered to be expressed at a somewhat higher rate in lymph nodes, bone marrow and testes. MIF4GD is expressed at an average rate that is 1.7 times higher than the average gene.

The promoter region of MIF4GD is approximately 1137 nucleotide base pairs long, and is predicted to interact with various transcription factors. The 5' untranslated region of MIF4GD mRNA transcripts is relatively short, at a length of around 137 nucleotides, and is predicted to form stem-loops and interior-loops to which RNA-binding proteins may bind. The 3' untranslated region is longer, at a length of approximately 510 nucleotides. The 3' UTR is also predicted to form stem-loops, interior-loops, and bulge-loops, as well as more complex secondary structures, and is predicted to bind to RNA-binding proteins and miRNAs at or near these sites.

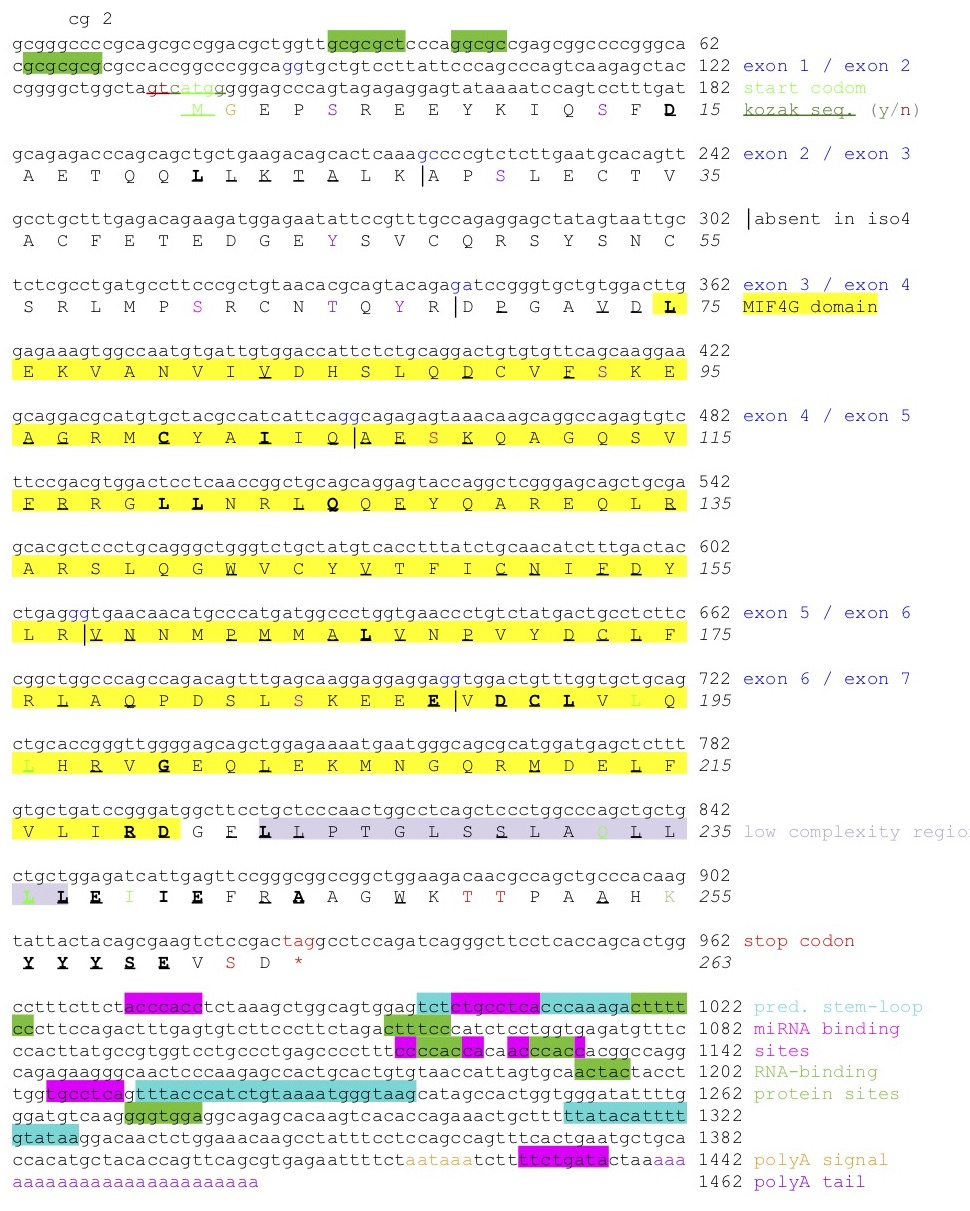
Conceptual Translation of MIF4GD mRNA and resulting protein. The MIF4G domain is highlighted in yellow, and a low complexity domain is highlighted in light purple. Predicted RNA-binding protein binding sites are highlighted in green, predicted miRNA binding sites are highlighted in pink, and predicted stem-loops are highlighted in blue. Conserved amino acids are bolded and/or underlined.

== Interactants ==
MIF4GD has been experimentally shown to bind to various other proteins, many of which play a role in alternative splicing of pre-mRNAs and translation of mRNAs into proteins. It also is known to interact with eukaryotic translation initiation factors, RNA, and DNA to form a translation initiation complex. Some of the most notable proteins that interact with MIF4GD are:

ATP-dependent RNA helicases DDX19A and DDX19B, which is involved in mRNA export from the nucleus and helicase activity by facilitating the disassociation of nuclear mRNA binding proteins and replacement with cytoplasmic mRNA binding proteins.

Cap binding complex dependent translation initiation factor, or CTIF, which is a paralog of MIF4GD. CTIF binds cotranscriptionally to the cap end of the nascent mRNA, and is involved in simultaneous editing and translation of mRNA that happens directly after export from the nucleus.

Histone RNA hairpin-binding protein, or SLBP, which is involved in histone pre-mRNA processing and movement of mRNAs from the nucleus to the cytoplasm of cells.

Supervillin, or SVIL, which is a peripheral membrane protein that forms a high-affinity link between the actin cytoskeleton and the membrane and contributes to myogenic membrane structure and differentiation. Supervillin also regulates cell spreading and motility during the cell cycle.

MIF4GD also has been verified by two-hybrid bait-prey experiments to interact with NSP7ab, or Non-structural protein 7, of SARS-CoV.

== Function and clinical significance ==
MIF4GD has several known functions, including the activation of proteins that bind histone mRNAs for translation and binding of mRNAs for alternative splicing and translation into proteins. Additionally, down-regulation of the SLIP1/MIF4GD gene and corresponding protein results in a reduced rate of histone mRNA translation and reduced cell viability. Therefore, it is speculated to be needed in eukaryotic cells in order to produce proteins and for cell proliferation.

MIF4GD has been shown to bind and stabilize p27^{Kip1}, which plays an important role in the regulating the cell cycle and in cancer progression. When bound to MIF4GD, the stabilized protein suppresses phosphorylation by CDK2 at T187, which controls the amount of cell proliferation in hepatocellular carcinoma (HCC). Regulation of this interaction is being studied as a potential therapeutic treatment for patients with hepatocellular carcinoma. This provides more evidence that MIF4GD helps regulate cell proliferation, and suggests MIF4GD may play a role in immune response.

An unrooted phylogenetic tree of 19 MIF4GD orthologs, showing the divergence from the human MIF4GD protein (annotated with black arrow). Mammals are annotated with orange box, chordates by a red circle, and arthropods are within green oval.

== Sequence homology and evolutionary history ==
MIF4GD is found in Animalia, and first appeared in Porifera, which diverged from Homo sapiens around 777 million years ago. Relative to humans, this gene is highly conserved (>80% identity and >90% similarity) in mammals and reptiles, moderately conserved (>70% identity and >85% similarity) in chordates, and low levels of conservation (15-25% identity and 25-40% similarity) to the rest of Animalia. MIF4GD is not present in trichoplax, fungi, plants, protists, archaea or bacteria.

=== Orthologs ===
There are currently 310 known and sequenced MIF4GD orthologs found in Animalia. A select number of these orthologs have been analyzed for estimated time of divergence (in millions of years), amino acid sequence identity to humans, and amino acid sequence similarity to humans. The results are shown in the table below:

Genus and species	Common name	Accession number	Date of Divergence (MYA)	Sequence Identity (%)	Sequence Similarity (%)
Homo sapiens	Human	NP_001229430	0	100	100
Pan paniscus	Bonobo	XP_034798762	6.4	100	100
Mus musculus	House mouse	NP_001230513	89	93.2	97.7
Vombatus ursinus	Common wombat	XP_027728462	160	91.0	95.9
Ornithorhynchus anatinus	Platypus	XP_028912780	180	77.9	90.5
Crocodylus porosus	Saltwater Crocodile	XP_019398085	318	85.1	91.4
Gallus gallus	Chicken	XP_015150938	318	83.8	90.1
Xenopus tropicalis	Tropical clawed frog	NP_001016440	351.7	74.4	84.8
Danio rerio	Zebrafish	NP_001013302	433	73.9	86.0
Rhincodon typus	Whale shark	XP_020392528	465	71.2	85.1
Petromyzom marinus	Sea lamprey	XP_032832018	599	48.7	69.4
Exaiptasia pallida	Pale anemone	XP_020912437	687	22.6	37.3
Limulus polyphemus	Atlantic horseshoe crab	XP_013791968	736	22.5	39.5
Parasteatoda tepidariorum	Common house spider	XP_015912223	736	19.5	33.9
Drosophila virilis	Fruit fly	XP_015028674	736	16.2	29.6
Temnothorax curvispinosus	Ant	XP_024872082	736	14.1	25.6
Amphimedon queenslandica	Sponge	XP_011404567	777	20.4	39.6

=== Paralogs ===
MIF4GD has two known paralogs, which are PAIP1 and CTIF. Both known paralogs have moderate to low conservation to MIF4GD, with less than 15% identity and between 20 and 25% similarity. However, both of these genes are predicted to have diverged before the evolution of orthologs, and scored E-values of nearly zero, indicating a significant relationship with MIF4GD.

MIF4GD is a slowly-evolving gene, with an approximate average of 75 amino acid changes per hundred amino acids per million years. Multiple sequence alignments of human MIF4GD and its orthologs showed two conserved amino acids throughout all sequences, which are Gly200 and Glu241.
