= Polynucleotide 5'-phosphatase =

polynucleotide 5′-phosphatase

Identifiers
- EC no.: 3.1.3.33
- CAS no.: 37288-17-8

Databases
- IntEnz: IntEnz view
- BRENDA: BRENDA entry
- ExPASy: NiceZyme view
- KEGG: KEGG entry
- MetaCyc: metabolic pathway
- PRIAM: profile
- PDB structures: RCSB PDB PDBe PDBsum
- Gene Ontology: AmiGO / QuickGO
Search
- PMC: articles
- PubMed: articles
- NCBI: proteins

The enzyme polynucleotide 5′-phosphatase (RNA 5′-triphosphatase, RTPase, EC 3.1.3.33) is an enzyme that catalyzes the reaction

a 5′-phosphopolynucleotide + H_{2}O $\rightleftharpoons$ a polynucleotide + phosphate

This enzyme belongs to the family of hydrolases, specifically those acting on phosphoric monoester bonds. The systematic name is polynucleotide 5′-phosphohydrolase. This enzyme is also called 5′-polynucleotidase.

The only specific molecular function known is the catalysis of the reaction:

a 5′-end triphospho-(purine-ribonucleotide) in mRNA + H_{2}O = a 5′-end diphospho-(purine-ribonucleoside) in mRNA + phosphate

RTPases cleave the 5′-terminal γ-β phosphoanhydride bond of nascent messenger RNA molecules, enabling the addition of a five-prime cap as part of post-transcriptional modifications. RTPases generate 5′-diphosphate-ended mRNA and a phosphate ion from 5′-triphosphate-ended precursor mRNA. mRNA guanylyltransferase then adds a backwards guanosine monophosphate (GMP) group from GTP, generating pyrophosphate, and mRNA (guanine-N7-)-methyltransferase methylates the guanine to form the final 5′-cap structure.

There are two families of RTPases known so far:

- the metal-dependent family. Yeast, protozoan, and viral RTPases require a metal co-factor for their activity, which is most often either Mg^{2+} or Mn^{2+}. This class of enzymes is also able to hydrolyze free nucleoside triphosphates in the presence of either Mn^{2+} or Co^{2+}.
- the metal-independent family. These groups do not require metals for their activity, and some enzymes have been shown to be inactivated in the presence of metal ions. These enzymes are very much similar to protein tyrosine phosphatases in their structure and mechanism. This family includes RTPases from mammals, plants, and other higher eukaryotes, and is structurally and mechanistically different from the metal-dependent RTPase family.

== Structural studies ==
As of late 2007, 5 structures have been solved for this class of enzymes, with PDB accession codes 1D8H, 1D8I, 1I9S, 1I9T, and 1YN9.

== See also ==
- Transcription (genetics)
- Five-prime cap
