= Holo ACP synthase =

Holo ACP synthase may refer to:

- Malonate decarboxylase holo-(acyl-carrier protein) synthase, an enzyme.
- Holo-ACP synthase, an enzyme.
