= NAD+ Five-prime cap =

Biomolecule

In molecular biology, the NAD+ five-prime cap (NAD+ 5' cap) refers to a molecule of nicotinamide adenine dinucleotide (NAD+), a nucleoside-containing metabolite, covalently bonded the 5' end of cellular mRNA. While the more common methylated guanosine (m7G) cap is added to RNA by a capping complex that associates with RNA polymerase II (RNAP II), the NAD cap is added during transcriptional initiation by the RNA polymerase (RNAP) itself, acting as a non-canonical initiating nucleotide (NCIN). As such, while m7G capping can only occur in organisms possessing specialized capping complexes, because NAD capping is performed by RNAP itself, it is hypothesized to occur in most, if not all, organisms.

The NAD+ 5' cap has been observed in bacteria, contrary to the long-held belief that prokaryotes lacked 5'-capped RNA, as well as on the 5' cap of eukaryotic mRNA, in place of the m7G cap. This modification also potentially allows for selective degradation of RNA]within prokaryotes as different pathways are involved in the degradation of NAD+-capped and uncapped 5′-triphosphate-RNAs.

In eukaryotic cells, while the more commonly observed m7G cap promotes the stability of the mRNA and supports translation, the NAD+ cap targets the RNA transcript for decay, facilitated by the non-canonical decapping enzyme, DXO. Considering the centrality of NAD in redox chemistry and post-translational protein modification, its attachment to RNA represents potentially undiscovered pathways in RNA metabolism and regulation.

== Function in prokaryotes ==
In prokaryotes, the 5' NAD+ modification is established by bacterial RNAP during transcription initiation and has been shown to display functions analogous to those of the eukaryotic 5' cap. In-vitro transcribed NAD-modified RNA was shown to be more resistant to RNase E, the main enzyme in the decay pathway of E. coli. NAD-modification further was shown to decelerate RNA processing by RNA pyrophosphohydrolase (RppH), which is known to trigger RNase-E-mediated decay through the conversion of 5′-triphosphate-RNA to 5′-monophosphate-RNA. Nudc, a nudix phosphohydrolase, can decap NAD-RNA through hydrolyzing NAD(H) into NMN(H) and AMP, causing RNase-E-mediated decay, but is inactive against 5′-triphosphate-RNA. This 5' modification allows for the selective initiation of degradation for a subset of RNAs as the NAD-capped RNAs are stabilized in the presence of RppH, but are decapped by Nudc, while the 5′-triphosphate-RNAs are susceptible to RppH but not Nudc.

Next generation sequencing (NGS) of the NAD-RNA conjugates in E. coli revealed an abundance of a specific group of small regulatory RNAs (sRNAs) which are known to be involved in stress response systems, as well as enzymes involved in cellular metabolism. The small number of RNA transcripts with a NAD cap might allow the cell to selectively degrade these RNAs separately from other pathways. Considering that the stress responses are known to affect NAD+ concentration, this finding further supports the possibility of undiscovered pathways linking the energetic state of a cell to mRNA turnover.

NAD capping has also been suggested to recruit specific proteins to the 5' end of the RNA as NAD is one of the most common protein ligands. NAD-binding pockets are well characterized in many proteins and could help the localization of the RNA to an enzyme or receptor. Many NAD-utilizing metabolic enzymes can also bind to RNA, presenting the possibility of unknown ribonucleoprotein complexes.

== Function in eukaryotes ==
NAD+ 5' capped RNA have been found in yeast, humans, and Arabidopsis thaliana. In eukaryotes, the NAD+ cap is removed by non-canonical decapping enzymes from the DXO family. DeNADing by DXO results in a 5' end monophosphate RNA distinct from NudC which results in NMN plus 5′ monophosphate RNA. Importantly, DXO is ~6 fold more efficient at decapping NAD+ compared to m7G, suggesting that it selectively degrades NAD-capped RNA rather than the more common m7G cap, similar to NudC.

The m7G cap has been shown to promote translation through recruitment of the initiation complex onto the mRNA. However, the NAD+-cap does not provide a similar function as NAD+-capped and polyadenylated mRNA displayed similar levels of translation in vitro to uncapped mRNA. Additionally, the 5' NAD+ cap further promotes decay of the RNA it is attached to, NAD+-capped and polyadenylated mRNA were demonstrated in vitro to be less stable than mRNAs lacking a 5' cap, suggesting that the NAD+ modification is actively facilitating DXO-mediated RNA decay.

While the relationship between RNA-binding proteins, such as glyceraldehyde-3-phosphate dehydrogenase (GAPDH), and NAD+ concentration is established, the NAD+ cap has been hypothesized to represent a direct link between RNA expression levels and cellular metabolism. It is known that energy stresses such as glucose deprivation and caloric restriction influence NAD+ concentrations and can possibly impact NAD+ capping. Additionally, as low-nutrient conditions can affect mRNA stability, and seeing as NAD+ caps promote mRNA decay, it is possible that the energetic state of a cell could affect NAD+-capping and thus mRNA turnover. Certain findings, such as the higher abundance of NAD+-capped transcripts in stationary-phase bacteria as well as yeast grown on synthetic media, point toward this possibility.
