= Streptomycin 3"-adenylyltransferase =

streptomycin 3"-adenylyltransferase

Identifiers
- EC no.: 2.7.7.47
- CAS no.: 52660-23-8

Databases
- IntEnz: IntEnz view
- BRENDA: BRENDA entry
- ExPASy: NiceZyme view
- KEGG: KEGG entry
- MetaCyc: metabolic pathway
- PRIAM: profile
- PDB structures: RCSB PDB PDBe PDBsum
- Gene Ontology: AmiGO / QuickGO
Search
- PMC: articles
- PubMed: articles
- NCBI: proteins

In enzymology, a streptomycin 3"-adenylyltransferase (EC 2.7.7.47) is an enzyme that catalyzes the chemical reaction:

ATP + streptomycin $\rightleftharpoons$ diphosphate + 3"-adenylylstreptomycin

Thus, the two substrates of this enzyme are ATP and streptomycin, whereas its two products are diphosphate and 3''-adenylylstreptomycin.

This enzyme belongs to the family of transferases, specifically those transferring phosphorus-containing nucleotide groups (nucleotidyltransferases). The systematic name of this enzyme class is ATP:streptomycin 3"-adenylyltransferase. Other names in common use include streptomycin adenylate synthetase, streptomycin adenyltransferase, streptomycin adenylylase, streptomycin adenylyltransferase, streptomycin-spectinomycin adenylyltransferase, AAD (3"), and aminoglycoside 3"-adenylyltransferase.
