= Aldose-1-phosphate adenylyltransferase =

aldose-1-phosphate adenylyltransferase

Identifiers
- EC no.: 2.7.7.36
- CAS no.: 37278-27-6

Databases
- IntEnz: IntEnz view
- BRENDA: BRENDA entry
- ExPASy: NiceZyme view
- KEGG: KEGG entry
- MetaCyc: metabolic pathway
- PRIAM: profile
- PDB structures: RCSB PDB PDBe PDBsum
- Gene Ontology: AmiGO / QuickGO
Search
- PMC: articles
- PubMed: articles
- NCBI: proteins

In enzymology, an aldose-1-phosphate adenylyltransferase (EC 2.7.7.36) is an enzyme that catalyzes the chemical reaction

ADP + alpha-D-aldose 1-phosphate $\rightleftharpoons$ phosphate + ADP-aldose

Thus, the two substrates of this enzyme are ADP and alpha-D-aldose 1-phosphate, whereas its two products are phosphate and ADP-aldose.

This enzyme belongs to the family of transferases, specifically those transferring phosphorus-containing nucleotide groups (nucleotidyltransferases). The systematic name of this enzyme class is ADP:alpha-D-aldose-1-phosphate adenylyltransferase. Other names in common use include sugar-1-phosphate adenylyltransferase, ADPaldose phosphorylase, adenosine diphosphosugar phosphorylase, ADP sugar phosphorylase, adenosine diphosphate glucose:orthophosphate adenylyltransferase, and ADP:aldose-1-phosphate adenylyltransferase.
