= Gentamicin 2"-nucleotidyltransferase =

Enzyme

gentamicin 2"-nucleotidyltransferase

Identifiers
- EC no.: 2.7.7.46
- CAS no.: 62213-33-6

Databases
- IntEnz: IntEnz view
- BRENDA: BRENDA entry
- ExPASy: NiceZyme view
- KEGG: KEGG entry
- MetaCyc: metabolic pathway
- PRIAM: profile
- PDB structures: RCSB PDB PDBe PDBsum
- Gene Ontology: AmiGO / QuickGO
Search
- PMC: articles
- PubMed: articles
- NCBI: proteins

In enzymology, a gentamicin 2"-nucleotidyltransferase (EC 2.7.7.46) is an enzyme that catalyzes the chemical reaction

nucleoside triphosphate + gentamicin $\rightleftharpoons$ diphosphate + 2"-nucleotidylgentamicin

Thus, the two substrates of this enzyme are nucleoside triphosphate and gentamicin, whereas its two products are diphosphate and 2''-nucleotidylgentamicin.

This enzyme belongs to the family of transferases, specifically those transferring phosphorus-containing nucleotide groups (nucleotidyltransferases). The systematic name of this enzyme class is NTP:gentamicin 2"-nucleotidyltransferase. Other names in common use include gentamicin 2"-adenylyltransferase, aminoglycoside adenylyltransferase, and gentamicin 2"-nucleotidyltransferase.
