= Kadipiro virus =

Virus classification
- (unranked): Virus
- Realm: Riboviria
- Kingdom: Orthornavirae
- Phylum: Duplornaviricota
- Class: Resentoviricetes
- Order: Reovirales
- Family: Sedoreoviridae
- Genus: Seadornavirus
- Species: Seadornavirus kadipiroense

Species of virus

Kadipiro virus (KDV) is a member of the virus family Sedoreoviridae. It is an arbovirus and has been isolated from Culex, Anopheles, Armigeres, and Aedes mosquitoes in Indonesia and China. Other members of the genus Seadornavirus have been linked to viral encephalitis.

== Characteristics ==
Kadipiro virus contains 12 segments of double-stranded RNA (dsRNA) with a 21,000 base-pair genome. The capsid is icosahedral and naked, though it does temporarily acquire a viral envelope as it buds from a host cell. Sedoreovirinae viruses contain and inner, intermediate and outer capsid. The capsid is 70 nanometers in diameter with capsid spikes and 7 structural proteins.

== Taxonomy ==
Kadipiro virus was once classified as Coltivirus JKT-7075. It has been reclassified to the genus Seadornavirus of the family Sedoreoviridae. Due to the dsRNA nature of the viral genome, the virus is classified as a Group III virus under the Baltimore classification system.

Since discovery of the Kadipiro virus several strains have been identified. JKT-7075 is now listed as one of those strains.

The genus Seadornavirus contains Banna virus, Kadipiro virus, and Liao ning virus. All three viruses can typically be found where Japanese encephalitis virus and Dengue virus have been reported.

== Geography ==
Kadipiro virus was once thought to only exist in Indonesia, but has since been isolated also from mosquitoes in China. The range includes the tropics and subtropics.

== Virology ==
Kadipiro virus was isolated in three mosquito genera: Culex, Anopheles and Armigeres and was grown in laboratory cultures. It was later found in Aedes mosquitoes. It was observed that the virus grew readily in mice and insect cell cultures with cytopathic effects in C6/36 (Aedes albopictus cell line), but was limited to BSR (clones of BHK cells) mammalian cells. No major disease resulted from infection in mice and immunological memory against a subsequent viral challenge was observed.
