= VP10 (disambiguation) =

VP10 is a video compression standard previously developed by Google.

VP10 or VP-10 may also refer to:

- VP-10, a U.S. Navy P-3C squadron
- VP10, a viral protein; for example see Banna virus
