= KDV =

KDV may refer to:

- Korteweg–de Vries equation, an equation of mathematical physics
- Kadipiro virus, an arbovirus
- Khadavli railway station, India (KDV)
- Vunisea Airport, Fiji (IATA:KDV)
