= RSMG =

RSMG may refer to:

- Russell Simmons Music Group
- 16S rRNA (guanine527-N7)-methyltransferase, an enzyme
