= Nucleoside-triphosphate-aldose-1-phosphate nucleotidyltransferase =

nucleoside-triphosphate-hexose-1-phosphate nucleotidyltransferase

Identifiers
- EC no.: 2.7.7.28
- CAS no.: 37278-26-5

Databases
- IntEnz: IntEnz view
- BRENDA: BRENDA entry
- ExPASy: NiceZyme view
- KEGG: KEGG entry
- MetaCyc: metabolic pathway
- PRIAM: profile
- PDB structures: RCSB PDB PDBe PDBsum
- Gene Ontology: AmiGO / QuickGO
Search
- PMC: articles
- PubMed: articles
- NCBI: proteins

In enzymology, a nucleoside-triphosphate-aldose-1-phosphate nucleotidyltransferase (EC 2.7.7.28) is an enzyme that catalyzes the chemical reaction

nucleoside triphosphate + alpha-D-aldose 1-phosphate $\rightleftharpoons$ diphosphate + NDP-hexose

Thus, the two substrates of this enzyme are nucleoside triphosphate and alpha-D-aldose 1-phosphate, whereas its two products are diphosphate and NDP-hexose.

This enzyme belongs to the family of transferases, specifically those transferring phosphorus-containing nucleotide groups (nucleotidyltransferases). The systematic name of this enzyme class is NTP:alpha-D-aldose-1-phosphate nucleotidyltransferase. Other names in common use include NDP hexose pyrophosphorylase, hexose 1-phosphate nucleotidyltransferase, hexose nucleotidylating enzyme, nucleoside diphosphohexose pyrophosphorylase, hexose-1-phosphate guanylyltransferase, GTP:alpha-D-hexose-1-phosphate guanylyltransferase, GDP hexose pyrophosphorylase, guanosine diphosphohexose pyrophosphorylase, nucleoside-triphosphate-hexose-1-phosphate nucleotidyltransferase, and NTP:hexose-1-phosphate nucleotidyltransferase.
