= Liao ning virus =

Virus classification
- (unranked): Virus
- Realm: Riboviria
- Kingdom: Orthornavirae
- Phylum: Duplornaviricota
- Class: Resentoviricetes
- Order: Reovirales
- Family: Sedoreoviridae
- Genus: Seadornavirus
- Species: Seadornavirus liaoningense

Species of virus

Liao ning virus (LNV) is a virus belonging to the genus Seadornavirus within the family Sedoreoviridae, a family of segmented, non-enveloped, double-stranded RNA viruses. LNV was first discovered in Aedes dorsalis populations in the Liaoning province of the People's Republic of China in 2006 from mosquito samples obtained in 1997. Its geographic distribution was previously thought to be limited to China, but it has since been found in mosquito populations in Australia. In addition to Aedes dorsalis, LNV has been isolated from Culex species.

== Virology ==
LNV's genome is about 20,700 base pairs in length, and is segmented into 12 parts, with each segment having a major open reading frame that encodes for proteins VP1–12. VP10, believed to be a capsid protein, is responsible for determining the serotype, of which two serotypes have been identified to date. VP1 is most likely the RNA-dependent RNA polymerase, VP3 is likely guanylyltransferase, a capping enzyme, VP7 shows similarities to protein kinases, and VP11 matches the dsRNA-binding proteins of other seadornaviruses. LNV is unique among seadornaviruses in that it is the only seadornavirus known to replicate in mammalian cells.

The most recent common ancestor of LNV isolates from China is estimated to have been in the year 318. Genetic analysis indicates that LNV populations were relatively stable for centuries but declined significantly in the late 1980s and early 1990s, before growing again starting in the late 1990s. LNV evolves at about the same rate as other dsRNA viruses but at a faster pace than other arboviruses. Part of LNV's genome is integrated into the Aedes aegypti genome, indicating that LNV likely originates from Africa, where Aedes aegypti is from, and didn't leave the continent until the growth of the shipping industry in the 18th and 19th centuries.

== Symptoms and diagnosis ==
LNV is not known to cause disease in humans, but it has been investigated as a cause of encephalitis in regions of China that experience seasonal encephalitis but are not affected by Japanese encephalitis. In mice, reinfection, or being infected again shortly after recovering from an initial infection, causes lethal hemorrhaging. The exact reason for this is unknown, but it does not appear to be related to any antibody-facilitating effect. An enzyme-linked immunosorbent assay (ELISA) based on the VP10 of both serotypes and a real time reverse transcription polymerase chain reaction (RT-PCR) based on genome segments 10 and 12 have been developed to identify and conduct serological surveys of LNV.
