= SRC1 =

SRC1 (systemic name YML034W or YML034w) is a yeast inner nuclear membrane protein which regulates subtelomeric genes and is linked to TREX (transcription export) factors. SRC1 produces two splice variant proteins with different functions; alternative splicing of SRC1 pre-mRNA is promoted by Hub1p; mutant has aneuploidy tolerance.
