= METTL1 =

Protein-coding gene in the species Homo sapiens

Identifiers
- Aliases: METTL1, C12orf1, TRM8, TRMT8, YDL201w, methyltransferase like 1, methyltransferase 1, tRNA methylguanosine
- External IDs: OMIM: 604466; MGI: 1339986; GeneCards: METTL1
Available structures
PDB	Ortholog search: PDBe RCSB
PDB	List of PDB id codes 3CKK
Enzyme activity
EC #	BRENDA	ExPASy	KEGG	MetaCyc
2.1.1.33	↗	↗	↗	↗

Gene location (Human)
Chr.	Chromosome 12 (human)
Band	12q14.1	Start	57,768,471 bp
Band	12q14.1	End	57,772,119 bp

Gene location (Mouse)
Chr.	Chromosome 10 (mouse)
Band	10|10 D3	Start	127,041,414 bp
Band	10|10 D3	End	127,046,365 bp
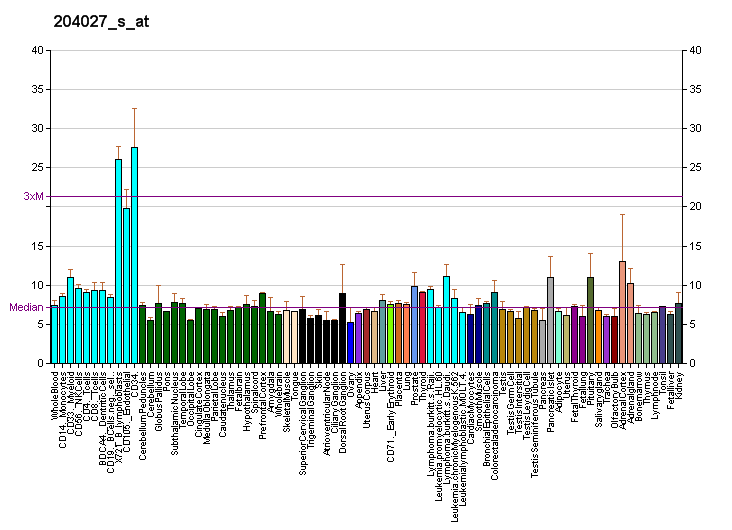
RNA expression pattern
Bgee	Human / Mouse (ortholog); Top expressed in: body of pancreas; gonad; pancreatic ductal cell; left adrenal cortex; right adrenal gland; testicle; right lobe of thyroid gland; right adrenal cortex; stromal cell of endometrium; left lobe of thyroid gland / Top expressed in: lacrimal gland; yolk sac; epiblast; embryo; blastocyst; embryo; right kidney; morula; proximal tubule; primitive streak; More reference expression data
BioGPS	More reference expression data
Gene ontology
Molecular function	methyltransferase activity; transferase activity; tRNA binding; tRNA (guanine-N7-)-methyltransferase activity; protein binding; RNA binding
Cellular component	tRNA methyltransferase complex; nucleolus; nucleus; nucleoplasm; cytosol
Biological process	methylation; tRNA modification; tRNA processing; tRNA (guanine-N7)-methylation; tRNA methylation; RNA (guanine-N7)-methylation
Sources:Amigo / QuickGO
Orthologs
Databases	NCBI: entry; OMA: entry
Species	Human	Mouse
Entrez	4234	17299
Ensembl	ENSG00000037897	ENSMUSG00000006732
UniProt	Q9UBP6	Q9Z120
RefSeq (mRNA)	NM_005371; NM_023032; NM_023033	NM_010792
RefSeq (protein)	NP_005362; NP_075422	NP_034922
Location (UCSC)	Chr 12: 57.77 – 57.77 Mb	Chr 10: 127.04 – 127.05 Mb
PubMed search
- Wikidata
View/Edit Human	View/Edit Mouse

tRNA (guanine-N(7)-)-methyltransferase is an enzyme that in humans is encoded by the METTL1 gene.

This gene is similar in sequence to the S. cerevisiae YDL201w gene. The gene product contains a conserved S-adenosylmethionine-binding motif and is inactivated by phosphorylation. Alternative splice variants encoding different protein isoforms and transcript variants utilizing alternative polyA sites have been described in the literature.

== See also ==
- 7-Methylguanosine
