= 7-Methylguanosine =

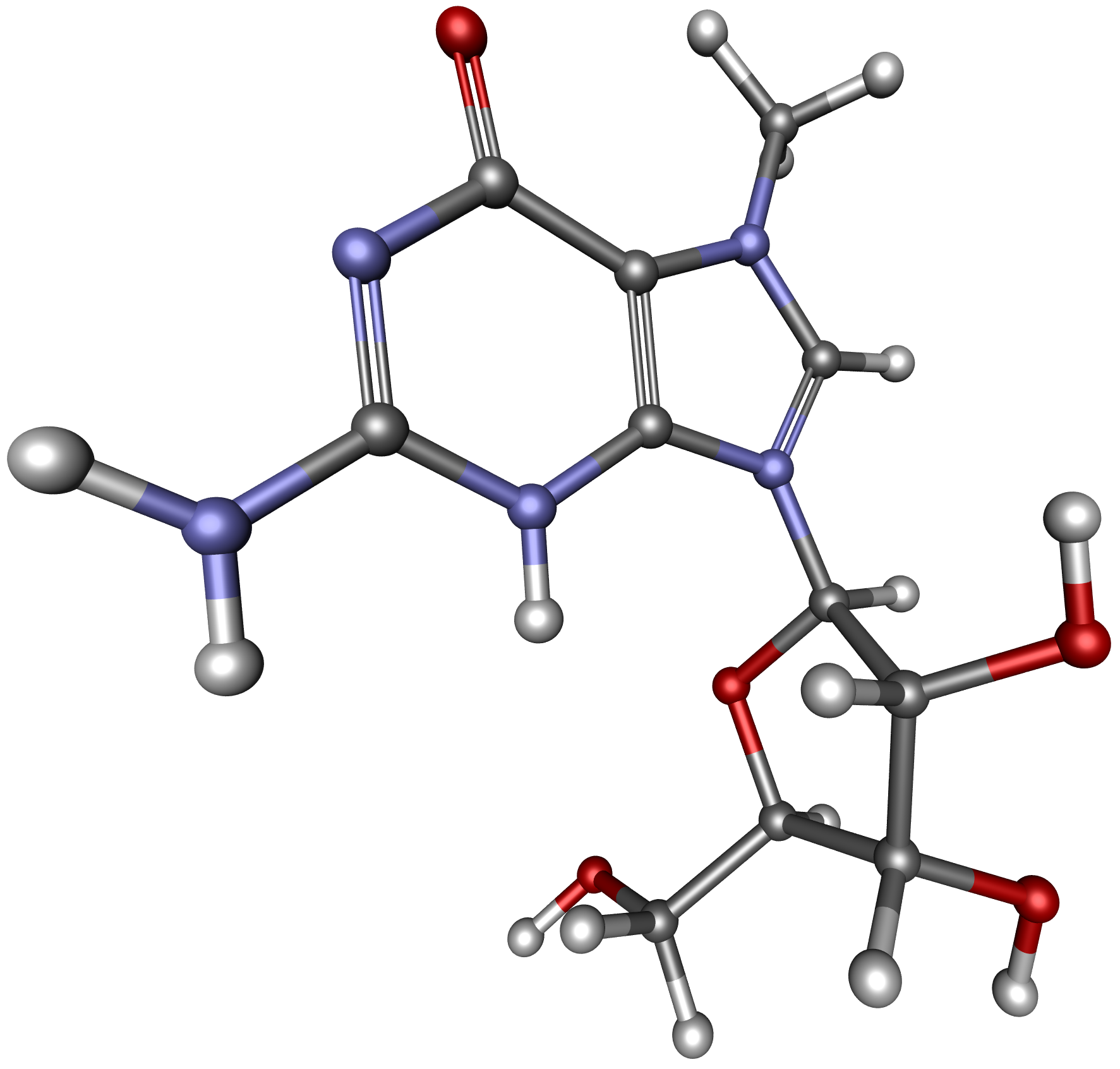

Names
- IUPAC name 7-Methylguanosin-7-ium
- Systematic IUPAC name 2-Amino-9-[(2R,3R,4S,5R)-3,4-dihydroxy-5-(hydroxymethyl)oxolan-2-yl]-7-methyl-6-oxo-6,9-dihydro-1H-purin-7-ium
- Other names N7-Methylguanosine; 2-Amino-1,6-dihydro-7-methyl-6-oxo-9-β-D-ribofuranosylpurinium

Identifiers
CAS Number	20244-86-4
3D model (JSmol)	Interactive image
Abbreviations	m7G; m^{7}G
ChEBI	CHEBI:20794
ChemSpider	393054
PubChem CID	445404
UNII	5290OM2I6G
- InChI: InChI=1S/C11H15N5O5/c1-15-3-16(8-5(15)9(20)14-11(12)13-8)10-7(19)6(18)4(2-17)21-10/h3-4,6-7,10,17-19H,2H2,1H3,(H2-,12,13,14,20)/p+1/t4-,6-,7-,10-/m1/s1 Key: OGHAROSJZRTIOK-KQYNXXCUSA-O; InChI=1/C11H15N5O5/c1-15-3-16(8-5(15)9(20)14-11(12)13-8)10-7(19)6(18)4(2-17)21-10/h3-4,6-7,10,17-19H,2H2,1H3,(H2-,12,13,14,20)/p+1/t4-,6-,7-,10-/m1/s1 Key: OGHAROSJZRTIOK-UJMNIJGGBX
- SMILES: O=C3/N=C(/N)Nc1c3n(c[n+]1[C@@H]2O[C@@H]([C@@H](O)[C@H]2O)CO)C

Properties
Chemical formula	C_{11}H_{16}N_{5}O_{5}
Molar mass	298.279 g·mol^{−1}
- Except where otherwise noted, data are given for materials in their standard state (at 25 °C [77 °F], 100 kPa). verify (what is ?) Infobox references

7-Methylguanosine (m^{7}G) is a modified purine nucleoside. It is a methylated version of guanosine and when found in human urine, it may be a biomarker of some types of cancer. In the RNAs, 7-methylguanosine have been used to study and examine the reaction evolving methylguanosine. It also participates in the formation of 5'-cap that stabilizes mRNA and prevents its degradation by 5' exonucleases.

== See also ==
- m7G(5')pppN diphosphatase
- METTL1
- Messenger RNA decapping
- 23S rRNA (guanine2445-N2)-methyltransferase
- 16S rRNA (guanine527-N7)-methyltransferase
- N1-Methylguanosine (m^{1}G)
