= M7G(5')pppN diphosphatase =

Class of enzymes

m7G(5')pppN diphosphatase

Identifiers
- EC no.: 3.6.1.59
- CAS no.: 82599-75-5

Databases
- IntEnz: IntEnz view
- BRENDA: BRENDA entry
- ExPASy: NiceZyme view
- KEGG: KEGG entry
- MetaCyc: metabolic pathway
- PRIAM: profile
- PDB structures: RCSB PDB PDBe PDBsum
- Gene Ontology: AmiGO / QuickGO
Search
- PMC: articles
- PubMed: articles
- NCBI: proteins

In enzymology, a m7G(5')pppN diphosphatase or m7G(5')pppN pyrophosphatase (EC 3.6.1.59) is an enzyme that catalyzes the chemical reaction

7-methylguanosine 5'-triphospho-5'-polyribonucleotide + H_{2}O $\rightleftharpoons$ 7-methylguanosine 5'-phosphate + 5'-diphospho-polyribonucleotide

Thus, the two substrates of this enzyme are 7-methylguanosine 5'-triphospho-5'-polynucleotide and H_{2}O, whereas its two products are 7-methylguanosine 5'-phosphate and 5'-diphospho-polyribonucleotide. It is responsible for messenger RNA decapping.

== Nomenclature ==
This enzyme belongs to the family of hydrolases, specifically those acting on acid anhydrides in phosphorus-containing anhydrides. The systematic name of this enzyme class is 7-methylguanosine-5'-triphospho-5'-polynucleotide 7-methylguanosine-5'-phosphohydrolase.

Another name in common use is decapase because this enzyme removes the N7-methylguanosine 5-phosphate cap from an mRNA. The process of mRNA decapping controls eukaryotic mRNA degradation.

== See also ==
- 5' cap
- 7-Methylguanosine
