= Holo-ACP synthase =

holo-citrate lyase synthase

Identifiers
- EC no.: 2.7.7.61
- CAS no.: 312492-44-7

Databases
- BRENDA: enzyme data
- ExPASy: NiceZyme view
- KEGG: enzyme entry
- MetaCyc: metabolic pathway
- Rhea: reactions
- PDB structures: RCSB PDB PDBe PDBsum
- Gene Ontology: AmiGO / QuickGO
Search
- PMC: articles
- PubMed: articles
- NCBI: proteins

In enzymology, a holo-ACP synthase (EC 2.7.7.61) is an enzyme that catalyzes the chemical reaction

2'-(5"-triphosphoribosyl)-3'-dephospho-CoA + apo-citrate lyase $\rightleftharpoons$ holo-citrate lyase + diphosphate

Thus, the two substrates of this enzyme are 2'-(5"-triphosphoribosyl)-3'-dephospho-CoA and apo-citrate lyase, whereas its two products are holo-citrate lyase and diphosphate.

This enzyme belongs to the family of transferases, specifically those transferring phosphorus-containing nucleotide groups (nucleotidyltransferases). The systematic name of this enzyme class is 2'-(5"-triphosphoribosyl)-3'-dephospho-CoA:apo-citrate lyase adenylyltransferase. Other names in common use include 2'-(5"-phosphoribosyl)-3'-dephospho-CoA transferase, 2'-(5"-triphosphoribosyl)-3'-dephospho-CoA:apo-citrate lyase, and CitX. This enzyme participates in two-component system - general.

== Structural studies ==
As of late 2007, only one structure has been solved for this class of enzymes, with the PDB accession code PDB: 2BDD.
