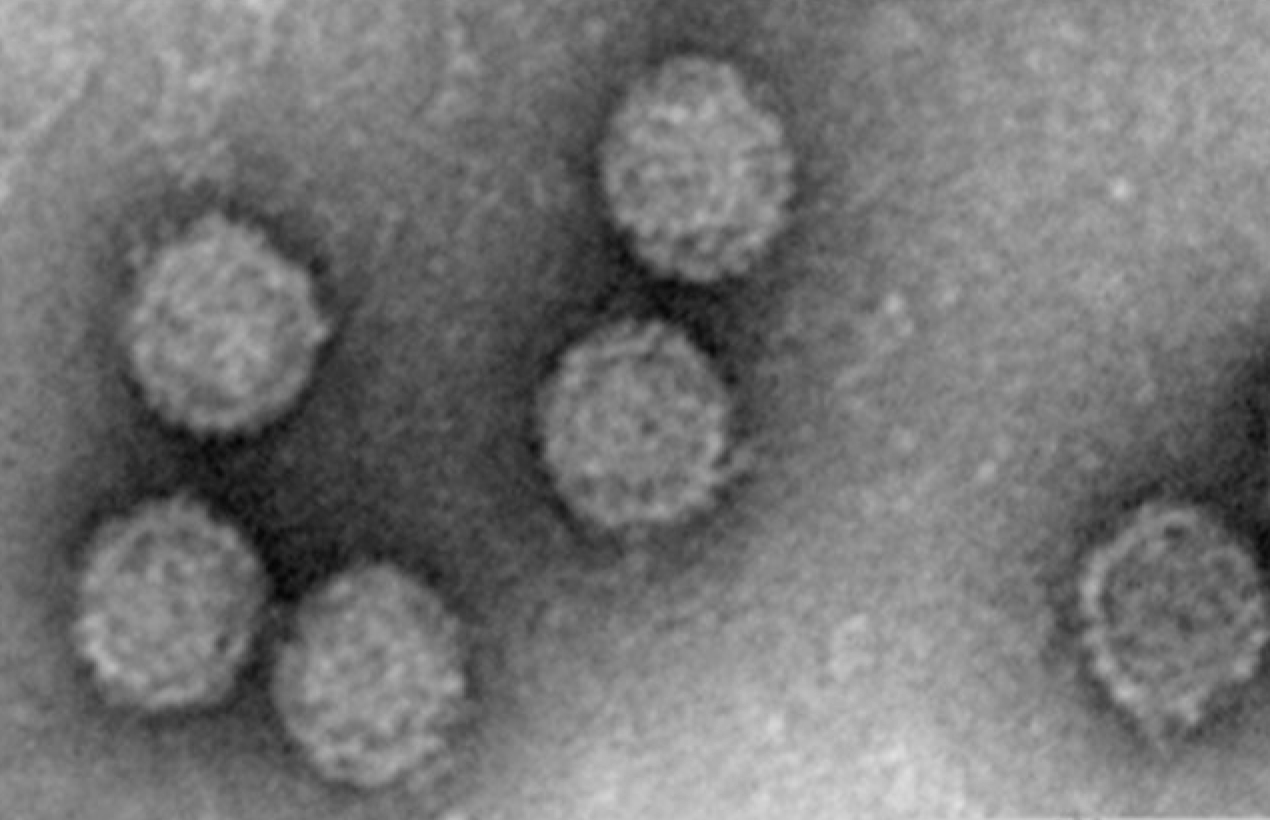
- Electron micrograph of Banna virus

Virus classification
- (unranked): Virus
- Realm: Riboviria
- Kingdom: Orthornavirae
- Phylum: Duplornaviricota
- Class: Resentoviricetes
- Order: Reovirales
- Family: Sedoreoviridae
- Genus: Seadornavirus

= Seadornavirus =

Genus of viruses

Seadornavirus is a genus of viruses, in the order Reovirales, in the family Sedoreoviridae. Human, cattle, pig, and mosquitoes serve as natural hosts. There are three species in this genus: Banna virus (BAV), Kadipiro virus, and Liao ning virus. Each of these viruses has been isolated from Aedes, Anopheles and Culex mosquito populations, but only BAV has been shown to cause infection in humans, in which the symptoms are similar to Japanese encephalitis—fever, malaise, and encephalitis. The word seadornavirus is a portmanteau, meaning Southeast Asian dodeca RNA virus.

== Taxonomy ==
The genus contains the following species, listed by scientific name and followed by the exemplar virus of the species:

- Seadornavirus bannaense, Banna virus
- Seadornavirus kadipiroense, Kadipiro virus
- Seadornavirus liaoningense, Liao ning virus

== Structure ==
Viruses in Seadornavirus are non-enveloped, with icosahedral geometries, and T=13, T=2 symmetry. The diameter is around 60-70 nm. Genomes are linear and segmented. Segments range in length from 862 to 3747 base pairs, totaling 21 kb in length. The genome codes for 12 proteins.

Genus	Structure	Symmetry	Capsid	Genomic arrangement	Genomic segmentation
Seadornavirus	Icosahedral	T=13, T=2	Non-enveloped	Linear	Segmented

== Life cycle ==
Viral replication is cytoplasmic. Entry into the host cell is achieved by attachment to host receptors, which mediates endocytosis. Replication follows the double-stranded RNA virus replication model. Double-stranded RNA virus transcription is the method of transcription. The virus exits the host cell by monopartite non-tubule guided viral movement. Human, cattle, pig, mosquitoes (arthropod-borne), and mosquitoes serve as the natural host. Transmission routes are zoonosis and bite.

Genus	Host details	Tissue tropism	Entry details	Release details	Replication site	Assembly site	Transmission
Seadornavirus	Humans; cows; pigs; mosquitoes	None	Cell receptor endocytosis	Cell death	Cytoplasm	Cytoplasm	Zoonosis; arthropod bite
