= U7 small nuclear RNA =

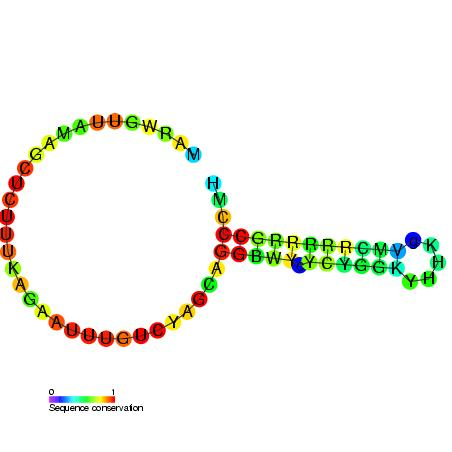
- Predicted secondary structure and sequence conservation of U7

Identifiers
- Symbol: U7
- Rfam: RF00066

Other data
- RNA type: Gene; snRNA
- Domain: Eukaryota
- SO: SO:0000274
- PDB structures: PDBe

The U7 small nuclear RNA (U7 snRNA) is an RNA molecule and a component of the small nuclear ribonucleoprotein complex (U7 snRNP). The U7 snRNA is required for histone pre-mRNA processing.

The 5' end of the U7 snRNA binds the HDE (histone downstream element), a conserved purine-rich region, located 15 nucleotides downstream the histone mRNA cleavage site. The binding of the HDE region by the U7 snRNA, through complementary base-pairing, is an important step for the future recruitment of cleavage factors during histone pre-mRNA processing.

== See also ==
- Duchenne muscular dystrophy
- Histone 3' UTR stem-loop
- LSM10
