= DDX19B =

Protein-coding gene in the species Homo sapiens

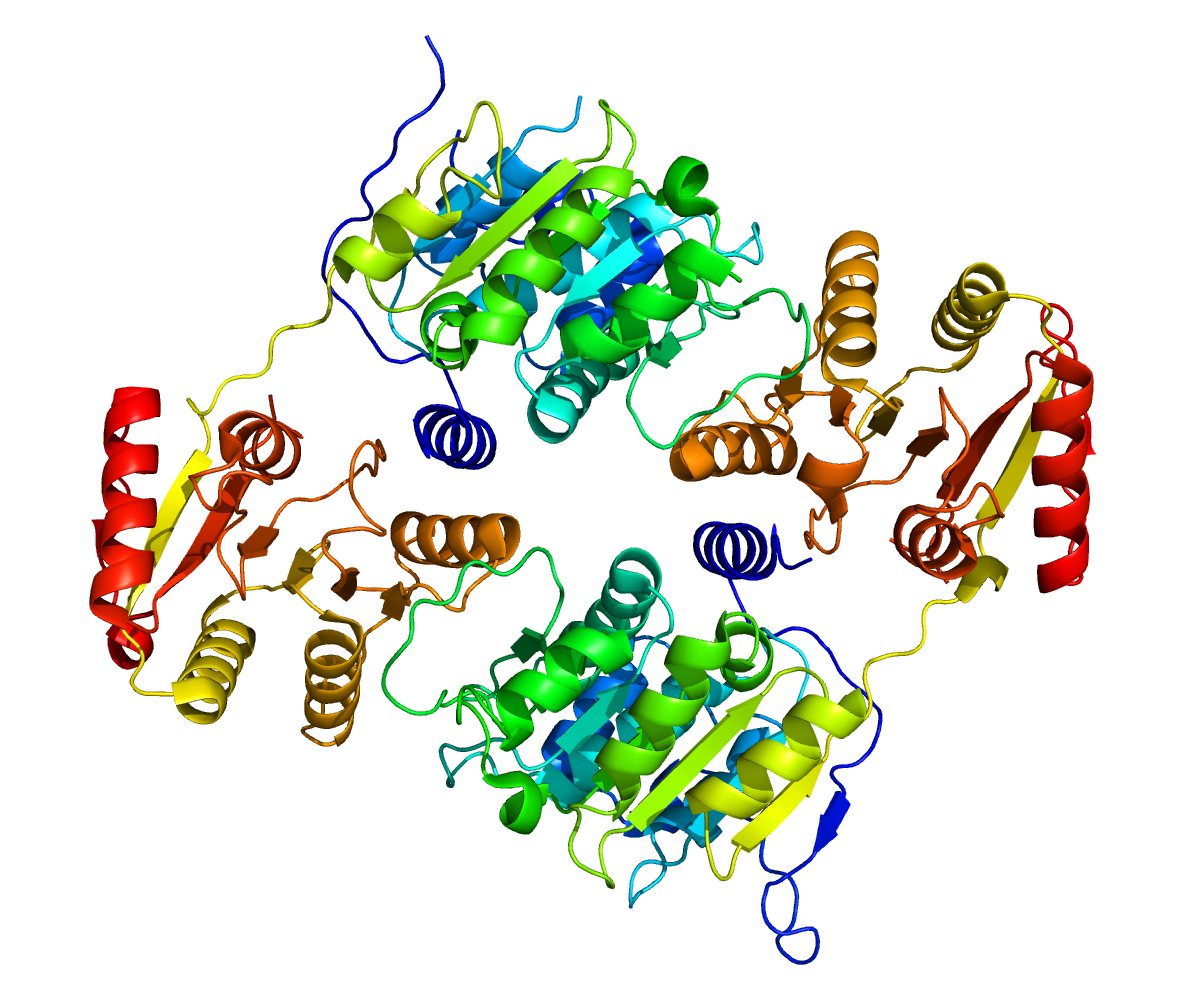

Identifiers
- Aliases: DDX19B, DBP5, DDX19, RNAh, DEAD-box helicase 19B
- External IDs: OMIM: 605812; MGI: 2148251; GeneCards: DDX19B
Available structures
PDB	Human UniProt search: PDBe RCSB
PDB	List of PDB id codes 3EWS, 3FHC, 3FHT, 3FMO, 3FMP, 3G0H
Enzyme activity
EC #	BRENDA	ExPASy	KEGG	MetaCyc
3.6.4.13	↗	↗	↗	↗

Gene location (Human)
Chr.	Chromosome 16 (human)
Band	16q22.1	Start	70,289,663 bp
Band	16q22.1	End	70,335,305 bp

Gene location (Mouse)
Chr.	Chromosome 8 (mouse)
Band	8|8 E1	Start	111,729,820 bp
Band	8|8 E1	End	111,758,383 bp
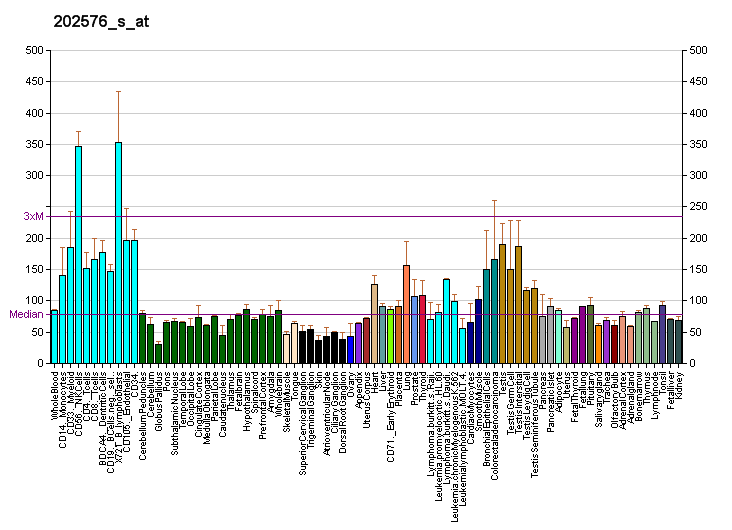
RNA expression pattern
Bgee	Human / Mouse (ortholog); Top expressed in: left testis; right testis; Achilles tendon; skin of leg; ganglionic eminence; gastric mucosa; granulocyte; bone marrow cell; ventricular zone; gastrocnemius muscle / Top expressed in: spermatocyte; Ileal epithelium; spermatid; secondary oocyte; lesser wing of sphenoid bone; lumbar spinal ganglion; seminiferous tubule; zygote; neural layer of retina; epiblast; More reference expression data
BioGPS	More reference expression data
Gene ontology
Molecular function	nucleotide binding; protein binding; hydrolase activity; ATP binding; helicase activity; RNA binding; nucleic acid binding
Cellular component	nuclear envelope; nuclear pore; nuclear membrane; extracellular exosome; membrane; nucleus; catalytic step 2 spliceosome; nucleolus; cytoplasm
Biological process	protein transport; mRNA transport; RNA secondary structure unwinding; mRNA export from nucleus; RNA splicing; regulation of gene expression; transport
Sources:Amigo / QuickGO
Orthologs
Databases	NCBI: entry; OMA: entry
Species	Human	Mouse
Entrez	11269	234733
Ensembl	ENSG00000157349	ENSMUSG00000033658
UniProt	Q9UMR2	n/a
RefSeq (mRNA)	NM_001014449; NM_001014451; NM_001257172; NM_001257173; NM_001257174 NM_001257175; NM_007242; NM_001363938	NM_001190786; NM_001190800; NM_172284
RefSeq (protein)	NP_001014449; NP_001014451; NP_001244101; NP_001244102; NP_001244103 NP_001244104; NP_009173; NP_001350867	n/a
Location (UCSC)	Chr 16: 70.29 – 70.34 Mb	Chr 8: 111.73 – 111.76 Mb
PubMed search
- Wikidata
View/Edit Human	View/Edit Mouse

ATP-dependent RNA helicase DDX19B is an enzyme that in humans is encoded by the DDX19B gene.

DEAD box proteins, characterized by the conserved motif Asp-Glu-Ala-Asp (DEAD), are putative RNA helicases. They are implicated in a number of cellular processes involving alteration of RNA secondary structure such as translation initiation, nuclear and mitochondrial splicing, and ribosome and spliceosome assembly. Based on their distribution patterns, some members of this family are believed to be involved in embryogenesis, spermatogenesis, and cellular growth and division. This gene encodes a DEAD box protein, which exhibits RNA-dependent ATPase and ATP-dependent RNA-unwinding activities. This protein is recruited to the cytoplasmic fibrils of the nuclear pore complex, where it participates in the export of mRNA from the nucleus. Multiple alternatively spliced transcript variants encoding different isoforms have been found for this gene.
