= Malonate decarboxylase holo-(acyl-carrier protein) synthase =

Identifiers
- EC no.: 2.7.7.66

Databases
- IntEnz: IntEnz view
- BRENDA: BRENDA entry
- ExPASy: NiceZyme view
- KEGG: KEGG entry
- MetaCyc: metabolic pathway
- PRIAM: profile
- PDB structures: RCSB PDB PDBe PDBsum
Search
- PMC: articles
- PubMed: articles
- NCBI: proteins

Malonate decarboxylase holo-(acyl-carrier protein) synthase (EC 2.7.7.66, holo ACP synthase, '2'-(5''-triphosphoribosyl)-3'-dephospho-CoA:apo ACP 2'-(5''-triphosphoribosyl)-3'-dephospho-CoA transferase, MdcG, 2'-(5''-triphosphoribosyl)-3'-dephospho-CoA:apo-malonate-decarboxylase adenylyltransferase, holo-malonate-decarboxylase synthase) is an enzyme with systematic name 2'-(5-triphosphoribosyl)-3'-dephospho-CoA:apo-malonate-decarboxylase 2'-(5-phosphoribosyl)-3'-dephospho-CoA-transferase . This enzyme catalyses the following chemical reaction

2'-(5-triphosphoribosyl)-3'-dephospho-CoA + malonate decarboxylase apo-[acyl-carrier protein] $\rightleftharpoons$ malonate decarboxylase holo-[acyl-carrier protein] + diphosphate

The delta subunit of malonate decarboxylase serves as an acyl-carrier protein (ACP) .
