= Histone 3′ UTR stem-loop =

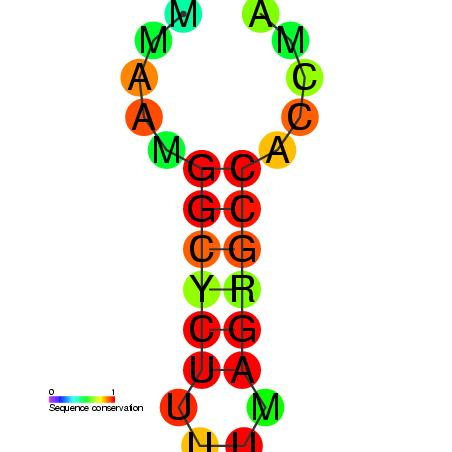
- Predicted secondary structure and sequence conservation of Histone3

Identifiers
- Symbol: Histone3
- Rfam: RF00032

Other data
- RNA type: Cis-reg
- Domain(s): Eukaryota
- GO: GO:0006398
- SO: SO:0000205
- PDB structures: PDBe

The histone 3′ UTR stem-loop is an RNA element involved in nucleocytoplasmic transport of the histone mRNAs, and in the regulation of stability and of translation efficiency in the cytoplasm. The mRNAs of metazoan histone genes lack polyadenylation and a poly-A tail, instead 3′ end processing occurs at a site between this highly conserved stem-loop and a purine rich region around 20 nucleotides downstream (the histone downstream element, or HDE). The stem-loop is bound by a 31 kDa stem-loop binding protein (SLBP - also termed the histone hairpin binding protein, or HBP). Together with U7 snRNA binding of the HDE, SLBP binding nucleates the formation of the processing complex.
