= Guanylyltransferase =

Class of enzymes

Guanylyl transferases are enzymes that transfer a guanosine mono phosphate group, usually from GTP to another molecule, releasing pyrophosphate. Many eukaryotic guanylyl transferases are capping enzymes that catalyze the formation of the 5' cap in the co-transcriptional modification of messenger RNA. Because the 5' end of the RNA molecule ends in a phosphate group, the bond formed between the RNA and the GTP molecule is an unusual 5'-5' triphosphate linkage, instead of the 3'-5' linkages between the other nucleotides that form an RNA strand. In capping enzymes, a highly conserved lysine residue serves as the catalytic residue that forms a covalent enzyme-GMP complex.

The transfer RNA (tRNA) for histidine is unique among eukaryotic tRNAs in requiring the addition of a guanine nucleotide before being aminoacylated by the histidine tRNA synthetase. The yeast guanylyl transferase specific to tRNA^{His} is unique in being the only known non-tRNA synthetase enzyme that specifically recognizes the tRNA anticodon.

Guanylyl transferases also exist for transferring guanosine nucleotides to sugar molecules, such as mannose and fucose.

== See also ==
- mRNA guanylyltransferase
