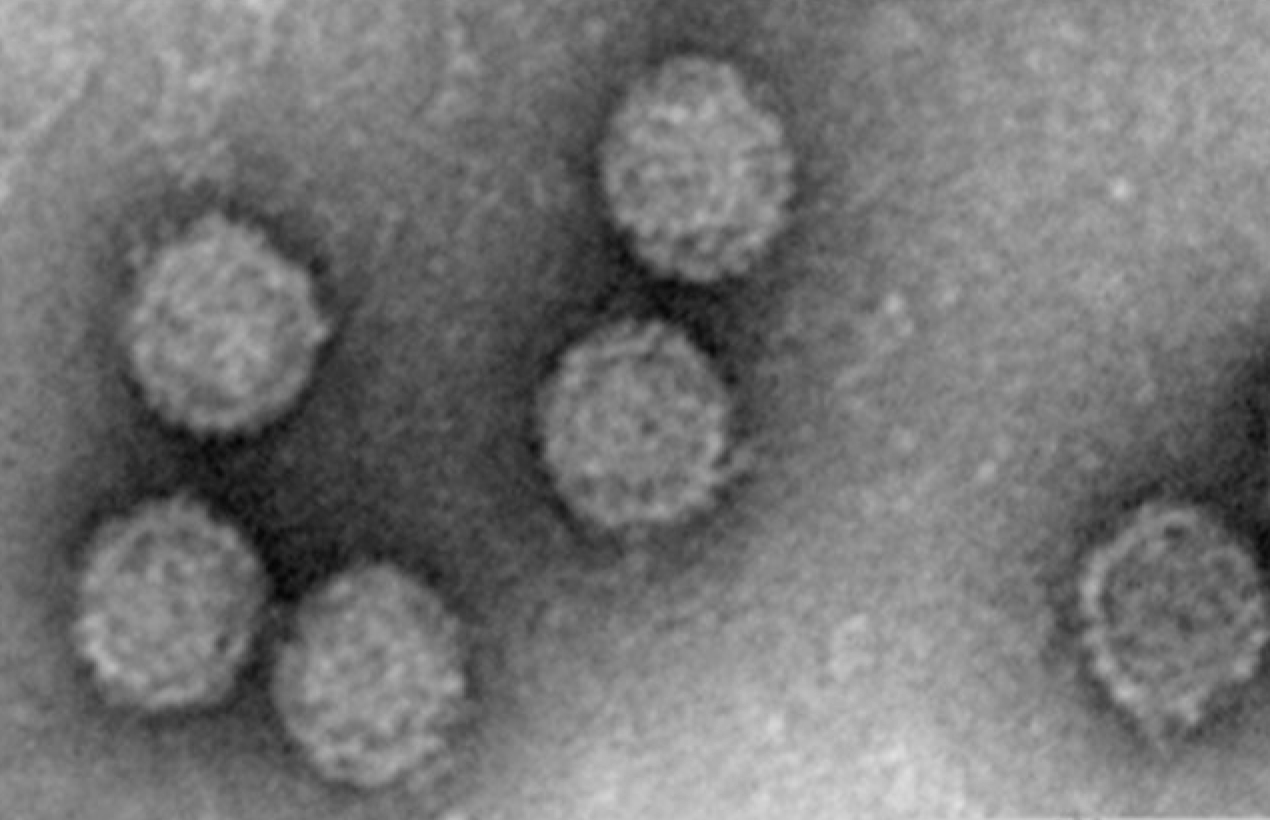
- Electron micrograph of Banna virus

Virus classification
- (unranked): Virus
- Realm: Riboviria
- Kingdom: Orthornavirae
- Phylum: Duplornaviricota
- Class: Resentoviricetes
- Order: Reovirales
- Family: Sedoreoviridae
- Genus: Seadornavirus
- Species: Seadornavirus bannaense

= Banna virus =

Species of virus

Banna virus (BAV) is a virus belonging to Reovirales, an order of segmented, non-enveloped, double-stranded RNA viruses. It is an arbovirus, being primarily transmitted to humans from the bite of infected mosquitoes of the genus Culex. Pigs and cattle have also been shown to become infected. The most common symptom of infection is fever, but in some cases encephalitis may occur. There is no specific treatment for infection, so treatment is aimed at alleviating the severity of symptoms until the immune system has cleared the infection.

== Virology ==
=== Structure and genome ===
BAV is a small (72–75 nm in size), non-enveloped, double-stranded RNA virus surrounded by an icosahedral protein coat. Fibre proteins extend outward from the surface of the protein coat. The genome of BAV is about 19,500 base pairs in length, linear and segmented into 12 parts, encoding for genes VP1-12. Seven of these, VP1-4 and VP8-10, are structural proteins. VP4 and VP9 form the outer protein coat. The inner particles of the coat are composed of VP1-3, VP8 and VP10. VP7 serves as a protein kinase, VP1 as an RNA-dependent RNA polymerase, VP3 as a capping enzyme, and VP12 as a dsRNA-binding protein.

=== Types and evolution ===
Rotaviruses share many physical and genetic characteristics with BAV, indicating a close genetic relation between the viruses. Phylogenetic analysis of the various BAV strains suggests that the BAV-Ch and BAV-In6969 strains were two individual genotypes at one point in time (A and B), before becoming the prototype species for two distinct serotypes (A and B) among all 38 identified strains.

== Diagnosis ==
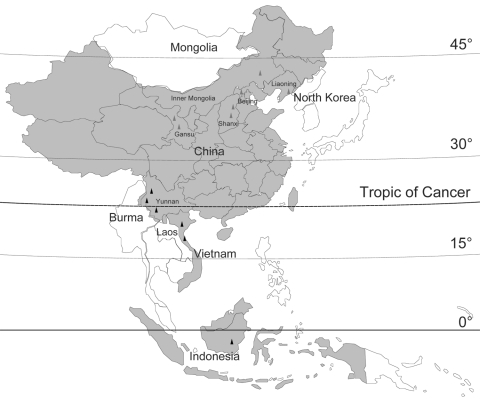
BAV isolation sites as of 2007. Countries reporting isolation of BAV are shaded grey.

Clinical features of BAV infection are non-specific and resemble other arboviral encephalitides, so laboratory diagnosis is required to identify BAV as the cause of illness. Detection of the nucleic acid of BAV can be performed with a TaqMan reverse transcription polymerase chain reaction (RT-PCR) assay by extracting RNA strands from a sample and reverse transcribing them into detectable cDNA. A recombinant VP9-based enzyme-linked immunosorbent assay (ELISA) can also be used to identify antibodies to BAV in blood serum and study the seroprevalence of BAV infection in a population.

== History ==
Banna virus was first isolated from the cerebrospinal fluid of encephalitis patients in Xishuangbanna, Yunnan province, People's Republic of China in 1987. Subsequent identification came in the Xinjiang province and the virus has since been found elsewhere in China, Indonesia, and Vietnam in mosquito populations. Because BAV displays similar symptoms to Japanese encephalitis virus (JEV) infection and the two viruses share their method of transmission and geographic distribution, it is possible that some past outbreaks attributed to JEV may have instead been caused by BAV.
