= Five-prime cap =

Specially altered nucleotide on the 5' end of pre-mRNA

In molecular biology, the five-prime cap (5′ cap) is a specially altered nucleotide on the 5′ end of some primary transcripts such as precursor messenger RNA. In eukaryotes, the main form is mRNA capping, a highly regulated process that uses 7-methylguanosine, vital in the creation of stable and mature messenger RNA able to undergo translation during protein synthesis. Mitochondrial mRNA and chloroplastic mRNA are not capped. There are also alternative caps.

== Structure ==
Ribose structure showing the positions of the 2′, 3′ and 5′ carbons.

When an RNA is made by a RNA polymerase (RNAP), it has a triphosphate group on its 5' end due to the use of nucleoside triphosphates (NTP, pppN) by the RNAP. In eukaryotes, the exposed ppp end is "capped" by a guanine soon after it is freed from the RNAP, forming the 5' cap. Due to how it formed, the cap connects to mRNA via an unusual 5′ to 5′ triphosphate linkage. This guanosine is methylated on the 7 position directly after capping in vivo by a methyltransferase. The result is a 7-methylguanylate (m^{7}G) cap. Cap-0, mRNA with only the m^{7}G cap, is the basic cap structure for eukaryotic mRNA. Its structure is written as m^{7}GpppN: m^{7}G, connected to a string of three phosphate groups, then to any other nucleotide.

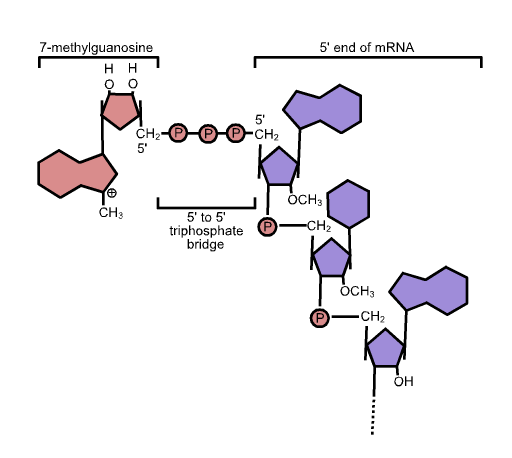
5′ cap structure (cap-2).

The first and second transcribed nucleotides can also be 2' O-methylated (N → Nm), leading to the Cap-1 and Cap-2 structures, respectively. Cap-1 has a methylated 2′-hydroxy group on the first ribose sugar[m^{7}G ppp Nm-], while cap-2 has methylated 2′-hydroxy groups on the first two ribose sugars [m^{7}G ppp Nm p Nm-], shown on the right. This is more common in higher eukaryotes and thought to be part of the innate immune system to recognize mRNAs from other organisms. The choice of whether to make these modifications vary by organism and the starting bases of the mRNA. This strategy is also adopted by some viruses that infect eukaryotes.

In all organisms, mRNA molecules can be decapped in a process known as messenger RNA decapping. This is usually followed by degradation of the mRNA.

== Capping process ==
The starting point for capping with 7-methylguanylate is the unaltered 5′ end of an RNA molecule, which terminates at a triphosphate group. This features a final nucleotide followed by three phosphate groups attached to the 5′ carbon. The capping process is initiated before the completion of transcription, as the nascent pre-mRNA (ppp(-5′)N[pN]_{n}) is being synthesized.

1. One of the terminal phosphate groups is removed by RNA triphosphatase (TPase), leaving a bisphosphate group (i.e. ppN[pN]_{n});
2. GTP is added to the terminal bisphosphate by mRNA guanylyltransferase (GTase), losing a pyrophosphate from the GTP substrate in the process. This results in the 5′–5′ triphosphate linkage, producing GpppN[pN]_{n};
3. The 7-nitrogen of guanine is methylated by mRNA (guanine-N7-)-methyltransferase (MTase), with S-adenosyl-L-methionine being demethylated to produce S-adenosyl-L-homocysteine, resulting in (m^{7}G)pppN[pN]_{n} (cap-0);

The above describes the canonical capping process involving a TPase, GTase, and a MTase, arriving at Cap-0. Cap-1 and Cap-2 can be produced from Cap-0 with 2'-O-methylation by a mRNA (nucleoside-2'-O-)-methyltransferase (2'-O-MTase). Further modification is also possible: for example, if the nearest cap-adjacent nucleotide is 2′-O-ribose methyl-adenosine (i.e. (m^{7}G)ppp(Am)[pN]_{n}), it can be further methylated at the N6 methyl position to form N^{6}-methyladenosine, resulting in 5′(m^{7}G)ppp(N^{6}Am)[pN]_{n}.

== Targeting ==
For capping with 7-methylguanylate, the capping enzyme complex (CEC) binds to RNA polymerase II before transcription starts. As soon as the 5′ end of the new transcript emerges from RNA polymerase II, the CEC carries out the capping process (this kind of mechanism ensures capping, as with polyadenylation). The enzymes for capping can only bind to RNA polymerase II, ensuring specificity to only these transcripts, which are almost entirely mRNA.

== Function ==
The 5′ cap has four main functions:

1. Regulation of nuclear export;
2. Prevention of degradation by exonucleases;
3. Promotion of translation (see ribosome and translation);
4. Promotion of 5′ proximal intron excision.

Nuclear export of RNA is regulated by the cap binding complex (CBC), which binds exclusively to 7-methylguanylate-capped RNA. The CBC is then recognized by the nuclear pore complex and exported. Once in the cytoplasm after the pioneer round of translation, the CBC is replaced by the translation factors eIF4E and eIF4G of the eIF4F complex. This complex is then recognized by other translation initiation machinery including the ribosome.

Capping with 7-methylguanylate prevents 5′ degradation in multiple ways. First, degradation of the mRNA by 5′ exonucleases (which are abundant in the nucleus) is prevented by chemically looking like a 3′ end. Second, the CBC and eIF4E/eIF4G block the access of decapping enzymes to the cap. Additional cap-binding proteins also contribute. This increases the half-life of the mRNA, essential in eukaryotes as the export and translation processes take significant time.

The mechanism of 5′ proximal intron excision promotion is not well understood, but the 7-methylguanylate cap appears to loop around and interact with the spliceosome in the splicing process, promoting intron excision.

== Decapping ==
Decapping of a 7-methylguanylate-capped mRNA is catalyzed by the decapping complex made up of at least Dcp1 and Dcp2, which must compete with eIF4E to bind the cap. Thus the 7-methylguanylate cap is a marker of an actively translating mRNA and is used by cells to regulate mRNA half-lives in response to new stimuli. Undesirable mRNAs are sent to P-bodies for temporary storage or decapping, the details of which are still being resolved.

The corresponding enzyme activity is m7G(5')pppN diphosphatase, which produces the products m7Gp and ppN-RNA.

== Beyond m7G ==
=== Viral mRNA capping processes ===
Viruses that infect eukaryotes employ a variety of stretegies to form caps that the host would recognize. Some encode the canonical trio of enzymes, occasionally in combination with a 2'-O-MTase (e.g. vaccinia virus). Some arrive at the canonical cap using different chemical steps, however:

- Many viruses employ "cap snatching", moving a cap from a cellular mRNA to one of their own. There are many ways to do so. The influenza A virus uses an endonuclease to cut off a ~17-base-long 5' part of a host cap-1 mRNA, then have its RNA-directed RNA polymerase (RdRP) continue off this start. The totivirus use a MTase to cut a m7-guanosine monophosphate (m^{7}GMP, m^{7}Gp) off the host m^{7}GpppRNA then glue it onto the viral pppRNA.
- Like other negative-sense RNA viruses, the mononegaviruses (e.g. rabies virus) produce mRNA using an RNA-directed RNA polymerase. Unlike cellular pre-mRNA that start with pppN, these RNAs start with a regular pA. The virus uses a GTPase to turn GTP into GDP, then uses a GDP polyribonucleotidyltransferase (PRNTase) to glue the GDP onto the pA-mNRA, forming GpppA-mRNA. The regular 7-methylation and 2'-O-methylation steps follow to arrive at the usual cap 1.

There are also ones that use more different options. For example, picornavirus has its RdRP build RNAs starting with a protein, which acts as a cap.

In addition, some of the Mimiviridae carry a variant of eIF4F for their own use. The viral version specifically recognizes m^{7}GpppAm-mRNA, the kind made by other viral proteins, and is not downregulated in times of stress like the host version.

=== snRNA ===
Eukaryotic small nuclear RNAs contain unique 5′-caps. Sm-class snRNAs are found with 2,2,7-trimethylguanosine (m_{3}G) caps, while Lsm-class snRNAs are found with monomethyl caps. Both are linked to the 5' end of the RNA via a triphosphate (ppp) linkage (in 5'-5' orientation in the case of m_{3}G), like the mRNA cap.

=== NAD(H)/dephospho-CoA ===
In bacteria, and potentially also in higher organisms, some RNAs are capped with NAD^{+}, NADH, or 3′-dephospho-coenzyme A (dpCoA). Unlike the eukaryotic caps, the bacterial caps are linked to 5' end of the RNA using a regular monophosphate (p) linkage; they internally contain a diphosphate linkage, however.

The mechanism of capping with NAD(^{+}/H) or dpCoA is different. Capping with these groups is accomplished through an "ab initio capping mechanism," in which NAD(^{+}/H) or dpCoA serves as a "non-canonical initiating nucleotide" (NCIN) for transcription initiation by RNA polymerase and thereby directly is incorporated into the RNA product. This is due to their structural similarity with ATP. Both bacterial RNA polymerase and eukaryotic RNA polymerase II are able to carry out this "ab initio capping mechanism" in vitro.

Capping with NAD(^{+}/H) or dpCoA is targeted by promoter sequence. NCIN capping occurs only at promoters that have certain sequences at and immediately upstream of the transcription start site and therefore occurs only for RNAs synthesized from certain promoters.

== See also ==
- Cap analysis gene expression
