= 23S rRNA (guanine2445-N2)-methyltransferase =

Class of enzymes

23S rRNA (guanine^{2445}-N^{2})-methyltransferase

Identifiers
- EC no.: 2.1.1.173

Databases
- IntEnz: IntEnz view
- BRENDA: BRENDA entry
- ExPASy: NiceZyme view
- KEGG: KEGG entry
- MetaCyc: metabolic pathway
- PRIAM: profile
- PDB structures: RCSB PDB PDBe PDBsum
Search
- PMC: articles
- PubMed: articles
- NCBI: proteins

23S rRNA (guanine^{2445}-N^{2})-methyltransferase (EC 2.1.1.173, ycbY (gene), rlmL (gene)) is an enzyme with systematic name S-adenosyl-L-methionine:23S rRNA (guanine^{2445}-N^{2})-methyltransferase. This enzyme catalyses the following chemical reaction

S-adenosyl-L-methionine + guanine^{2445} in 23S rRNA $\rightleftharpoons$ S-adenosyl-L-homocysteine + N^{2}-methylguanine^{2445} in 23S rRNA

The enzyme methylates 23S rRNA in vitro.
