= Messenger RNA decapping =

Removal of the 5' cap structure on mRNA

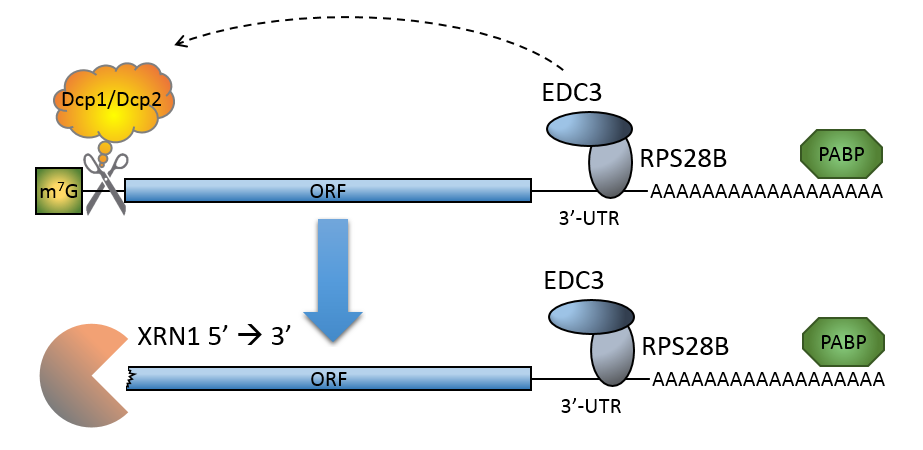
Schematic representation of deadenylation-independent decapping in S. cerevisiae

The process of messenger RNA decapping consists of hydrolysis of the 5' cap structure on the RNA exposing a 5' monophosphate. In eukaryotes, this 5' monophosphate is a substrate for the 5' exonuclease Xrn1 and the mRNA is quickly destroyed. There are many situations which may lead to the removal of the cap, some of which are discussed below.

In prokaryotes, the initial mRNA transcript naturally possesses a 5'-triphosphate group after bacterial transcription; the enzyme RppH removes a pyrophosphate molecule from the 5' end, converting the 5'-triphosphate to a 5'-monophosphate, triggering mRNA degradation by ribonucleases.

== Translation and decay ==
Inside cells, there is a balance between the processes of translation and mRNA decay. Messages which are being actively translated are bound by polysomes and the eukaryotic initiation factors eIF-4E and eIF-4G (in eukaryotes). This blocks access to the cap by the decapping enzyme DCP2 and protects the mRNA molecule. In nutrient-starvation conditions or viral infection, translation may be compromised and decapping is stimulated. This balance is reflected in the size and abundance of the cytoplasmic structures known as P-bodies.

== Specific decay pathways ==
A number of specific decay pathways exist that recognize aberrant messages and promote their decapping. Nonsense mediated decay recognizes premature stop codons and promotes decapping as well as decay by the exosome. Certain classes of miRNA have also been shown to stimulate decapping.

== See also ==
- m7G(5')pppN diphosphatase
