= SLBP =

Protein-coding gene in humans

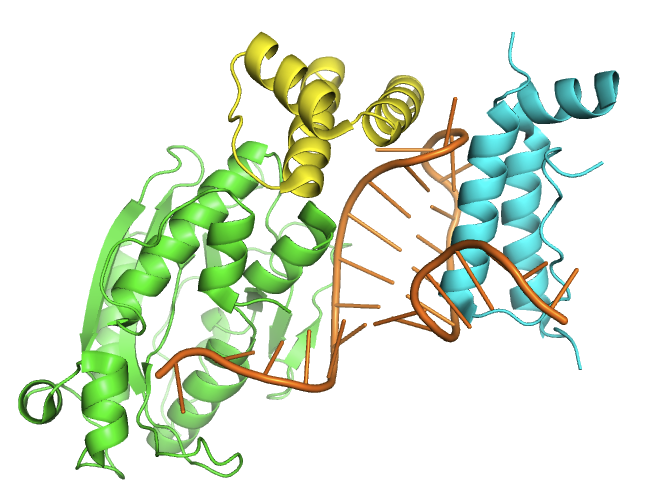

Identifiers
- Aliases: SLBP, HBP, stem-loop binding protein
- External IDs: OMIM: 602422; MGI: 108402; GeneCards: SLBP
Available structures
PDB	Ortholog search: PDBe RCSB
PDB	List of PDB id codes 2KJM, 4QOZ

Gene location (Human)
Chr.	Chromosome 4 (human)
Band	4p16.3	Start	1,692,731 bp
Band	4p16.3	End	1,712,344 bp

Gene location (Mouse)
Chr.	Chromosome 5 (mouse)
Band	5|5 B2	Start	33,792,296 bp
Band	5|5 B2	End	33,809,918 bp
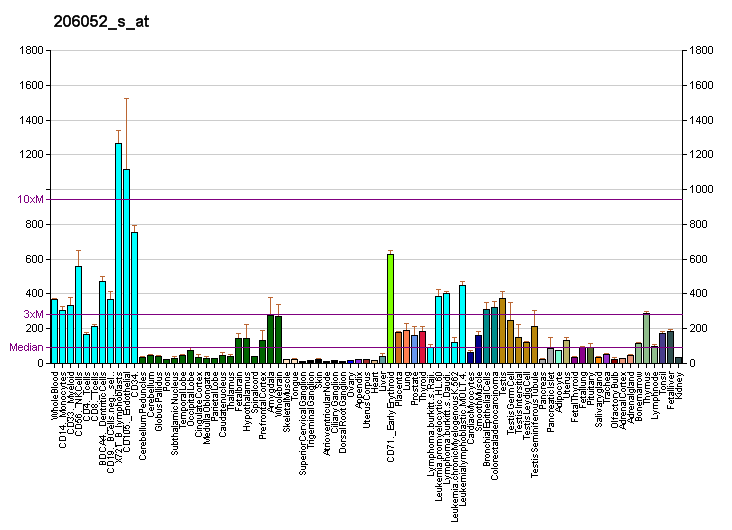
RNA expression pattern
Bgee	Human / Mouse (ortholog); Top expressed in: oocyte; secondary oocyte; right testis; left testis; bone marrow; parotid gland; ganglionic eminence; ventricular zone; gonad; retinal pigment epithelium / Top expressed in: zygote; spermatocyte; tail of embryo; embryo; embryo; ventricular zone; spermatid; morula; genital tubercle; blastocyst; More reference expression data
BioGPS	More reference expression data
Gene ontology
Molecular function	histone pre-mRNA DCP binding; histone pre-mRNA stem-loop binding; protein binding; mRNA binding; RNA binding; identical protein binding
Cellular component	cytoplasm; histone pre-mRNA 3'end processing complex; nucleoplasm; nucleus; nucleolus; cytosol; ribonucleoprotein complex
Biological process	termination of RNA polymerase II transcription; mRNA transport; mRNA 3'-end processing by stem-loop binding and cleavage; mRNA processing; mRNA export from nucleus; nuclear DNA replication; histone mRNA metabolic process; cell cycle phase transition
Sources:Amigo / QuickGO
Orthologs
Databases	NCBI: entry; OMA: entry
Species	Human	Mouse
Entrez	7884	20492
Ensembl	ENSG00000163950	ENSMUSG00000004642
UniProt	Q14493; Q53XR2	P97440
RefSeq (mRNA)	NM_001306074; NM_001306075; NM_006527	NM_001289724; NM_001289725; NM_009193
RefSeq (protein)	NP_001293003; NP_001293004; NP_006518; NP_006518.1	NP_001276653; NP_001276654; NP_033219
Location (UCSC)	Chr 4: 1.69 – 1.71 Mb	Chr 5: 33.79 – 33.81 Mb
PubMed search
- Wikidata
View/Edit Human	View/Edit Mouse

Histone RNA hairpin-binding protein or stem-loop binding protein (SLBP) is a protein that in humans is encoded by the SLBP gene.

== Species distribution ==
SLBP has been cloned from humans, C. elegans, D. melanogaster, X. laevis, and sea urchins. The full length human protein has 270 amino acids (31 kDa) with a centrally located RNA binding domain (RBD). The 75 amino acid RBD is well conserved across species, however the remainder of SLBP is highly divergent in most organisms and not homologous to any other protein in the eukaryotic genomes.

== Function ==
This gene encodes a protein that binds to the histone 3' UTR stem-loop structure in replication-dependent histone mRNAs. Histone mRNAs do not contain introns or polyadenylation signals, and are processed by a single endonucleolytic cleavage event downstream of the stem-loop. The stem-loop structure is essential for efficient processing of the histone pre-mRNA but this structure also controls the transport, translation and stability of histone mRNAs. SLBP expression is regulated during S-phase of the cell cycle, increasing more than 10-fold during the latter part of G1.

All SLBP proteins are capable of forming a highly stable complex with histone stem-loop RNA. Complex formation with the histone mRNA stem-loop is achieved by a novel three-helix bundle fold. SLBP proteins also recognize the tetraloop structure of the histone hairpin, the base of the stem, and the 5' flanking region. The crystal structure of human SLBP in complex with the stem-loop RNA as well as the exonuclease Eri1 reveals that the Arg181 residue of SLBP specifically interacts with the second guanine base in the RNA stem. The rest of the protein is intrinsically disordered in fruit-flies as well as in humans. A unique feature of the SLBP RBD is that it is phosphorylated in its RNA binding domain at the Thr171 residue. The SLBP RBD also undergoes proline isomerization about this sequence and is a substrate for the prolyl isomerase Pin1. The N-terminal domain of human SLBP is required for translation activation of histone mRNAs via its interaction with SLIP1. SLBP also interacts with the CBP80 associated protein CTIF to facilitate rapid degradation of histone mRNAs. SLBP is a phosphoprotein and besides T171, it is also phosphorylated at Ser7, Ser20, Ser23, Thr60, Thr61 in mammalian cells. The phosphorylation at Thr60 is mediated by CK2 and Thr61 is by Cyclin A/Cdk1.
