= MRNA (guanine-N7-)-methyltransferase =

Enzyme

mRNA (guanine-N7-)-methyltransferase

Identifiers
- EC no.: 2.1.1.56
- CAS no.: 56941-25-4

Databases
- BRENDA: enzyme data
- ExPASy: NiceZyme view
- KEGG: enzyme entry
- MetaCyc: metabolic pathway
- Rhea: reactions
- PDB structures: RCSB PDB PDBe PDBsum
- Gene Ontology: AmiGO / QuickGO
Search
- PMC: articles
- PubMed: articles
- NCBI: proteins

RNMT
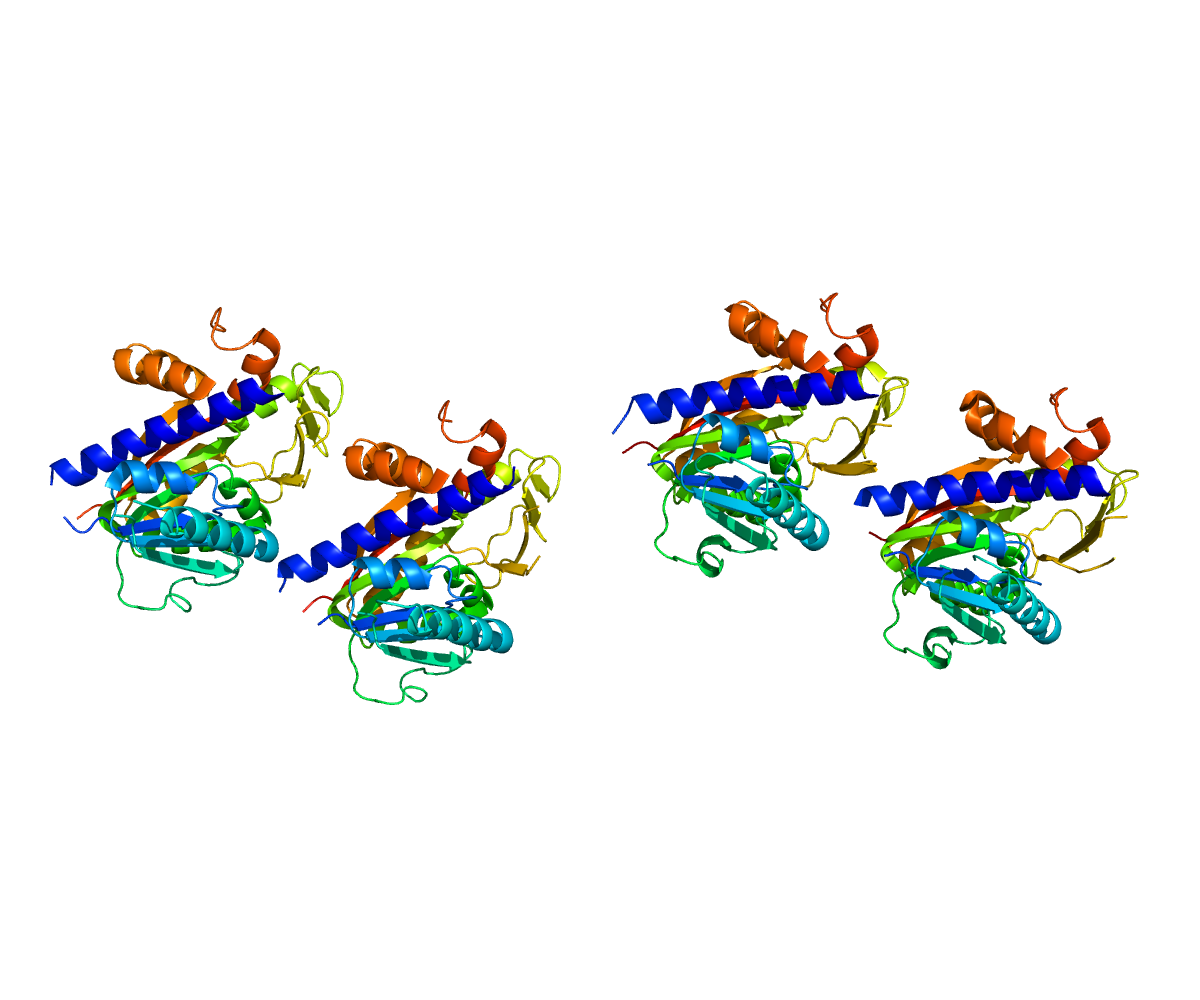

Identifiers
- Aliases: RNMT, MET, RG7MT1, hCMT1c, CMT1, CMT1c, cm1p, hCMT1, hMet, MRNA-methyltransferase, RNA guanine-7 methyltransferase, N7-MTase
- External IDs: OMIM: 603514; MGI: 1915147; GeneCards: RNMT
Available structures
PDB	Ortholog search: PDBe RCSB
PDB	List of PDB id codes 3BGV, 3EPP, 5E9J, 5E9W, 5E8J
Enzyme activity
EC #	BRENDA	ExPASy	KEGG	MetaCyc
2.1.1.56	↗	↗	↗	↗

Gene location (Human)
Chr.	Chromosome 18 (human)
Band	18p11.21	Start	13,726,660 bp
Band	18p11.21	End	13,764,556 bp

Gene location (Mouse)
Chr.	Chromosome 18 (mouse)
Band	18|18 E2	Start	68,433,426 bp
Band	18|18 E2	End	68,457,923 bp
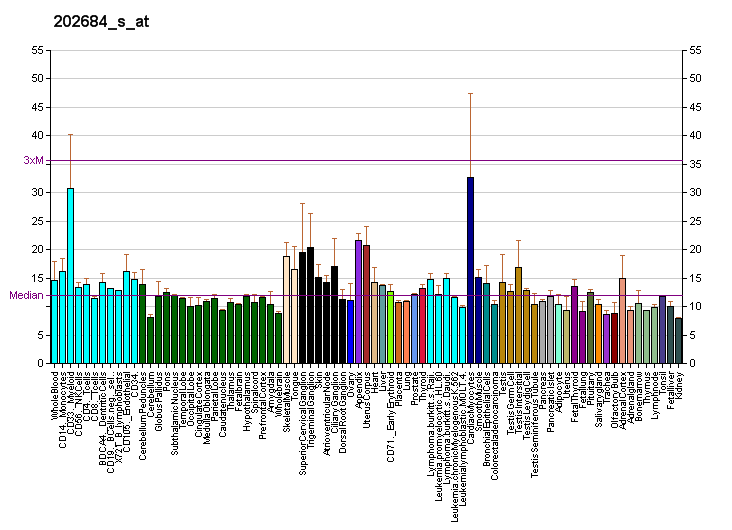
RNA expression pattern
Bgee	Human / Mouse (ortholog); Top expressed in: testicle; amniotic fluid; lateral nuclear group of thalamus; middle temporal gyrus; Brodmann area 23; pars compacta; tendon; Achilles tendon; cartilage tissue; internal globus pallidus / Top expressed in: secondary oocyte; morula; zygote; epiblast; primitive streak; embryo; substantia nigra; blastocyst; dentate gyrus of hippocampal formation granule cell; tail of embryo; More reference expression data
BioGPS	More reference expression data
Gene ontology
Molecular function	methyltransferase activity; transferase activity; mRNA (guanine-N7-)-methyltransferase activity; protein binding; RNA binding
Cellular component	mRNA cap binding complex; receptor complex; nucleus; nucleoplasm; fibrillar center; mRNA cap methyltransferase complex
Biological process	mRNA processing; methylation; transcription by RNA polymerase II; RNA 5'-cap (guanine-N7)-methylation; cellular response to leukemia inhibitory factor; 7-methylguanosine mRNA capping
Sources:Amigo / QuickGO
Orthologs
Databases	NCBI: entry; OMA: entry
Species	Human	Mouse
Entrez	8731	67897
Ensembl	ENSG00000101654	ENSMUSG00000009535
UniProt	O43148	Q9D0L8
RefSeq (mRNA)	NM_001308263; NM_003799; NM_001378132; NM_001378134; NM_001378135	NM_001170953; NM_026440; NM_001361002; NM_001361003
RefSeq (protein)	NP_001295192; NP_003790; NP_001365061; NP_001365063; NP_001365064	NP_001164424; NP_080716; NP_001347931; NP_001347932
Location (UCSC)	Chr 18: 13.73 – 13.76 Mb	Chr 18: 68.43 – 68.46 Mb
PubMed search
- Wikidata
View/Edit Human	View/Edit Mouse

In enzymology, a mRNA (guanine-N7-)-methyltransferase also known as mRNA cap guanine-N7 methyltransferase is an enzyme that catalyzes the chemical reaction

S-adenosyl-L-methionine + G(5')pppR-RNA $\rightleftharpoons$ S-adenosyl-L-homocysteine + m^{7}G(5')pppR-RNA (mRNA containing an N^{7}-methylguanosine cap)

Thus, the two substrates of this enzyme are S-adenosyl methionine and G(5')pppR-RNA, whereas its two products are S-adenosylhomocysteine and m7G(5')pppR-RNA. This enzyme belongs to the family of transferases, specifically those transferring one-carbon group methyltransferases.

In humans, mRNA cap guanine-N7 methyltransferase is encoded by the RNMT gene.

== Nomenclature ==
The systematic name of this enzyme class is S-adenosyl-L-methionine:mRNA (guanine-N7-)-methyltransferase. Other names in common use include:

- messenger ribonucleate guanine 7-methyltransferase,
- guanine-7-methyltransferase,
- messenger RNA guanine 7-methyltransferase, and
- S-adenosyl-L-methionine:mRNA (guanine-7-N-)-methyltransferase.
- cap MTase

== See also ==
- 7-Methylguanosine
