= MRNA guanylyltransferase =

Class of enzymes

mRNA guanylyltransferase

Identifiers
- EC no.: 2.7.7.50
- CAS no.: 56941-23-2

Databases
- IntEnz: IntEnz view
- BRENDA: BRENDA entry
- ExPASy: NiceZyme view
- KEGG: KEGG entry
- MetaCyc: metabolic pathway
- PRIAM: profile
- PDB structures: RCSB PDB PDBe PDBsum
- Gene Ontology: AmiGO / QuickGO
Search
- PMC: articles
- PubMed: articles
- NCBI: proteins

In enzymology, a mRNA guanylyltransferase (EC 2.7.7.50) is an enzyme that catalyzes the chemical reaction

GTP + (5')ppPur-mRNA $\rightleftharpoons$ diphosphate + G(5')pppPur-mRNA

Thus, the two substrates of this enzyme are GTP and (5')ppPur-mRNA, whereas its two products are diphosphate and G(5')pppPur-mRNA.

This enzyme belongs to the family of transferases, specifically those transferring phosphorus-containing nucleotide groups (nucleotidyltransferases).op The systematic name of this enzyme class is GTP:mRNA guanylyltransferase. Other names in common use include mRNA capping enzyme, messenger RNA guanylyltransferase, and Protein 2.

== Structural studies ==
As of late 2007, 5 structures have been solved for this class of enzymes, with PDB accession codes 1CKM, 1CKN, 1CKO, 1P16, and 2C46.
