= Nucleotidyltransferase =

Class of enzymes

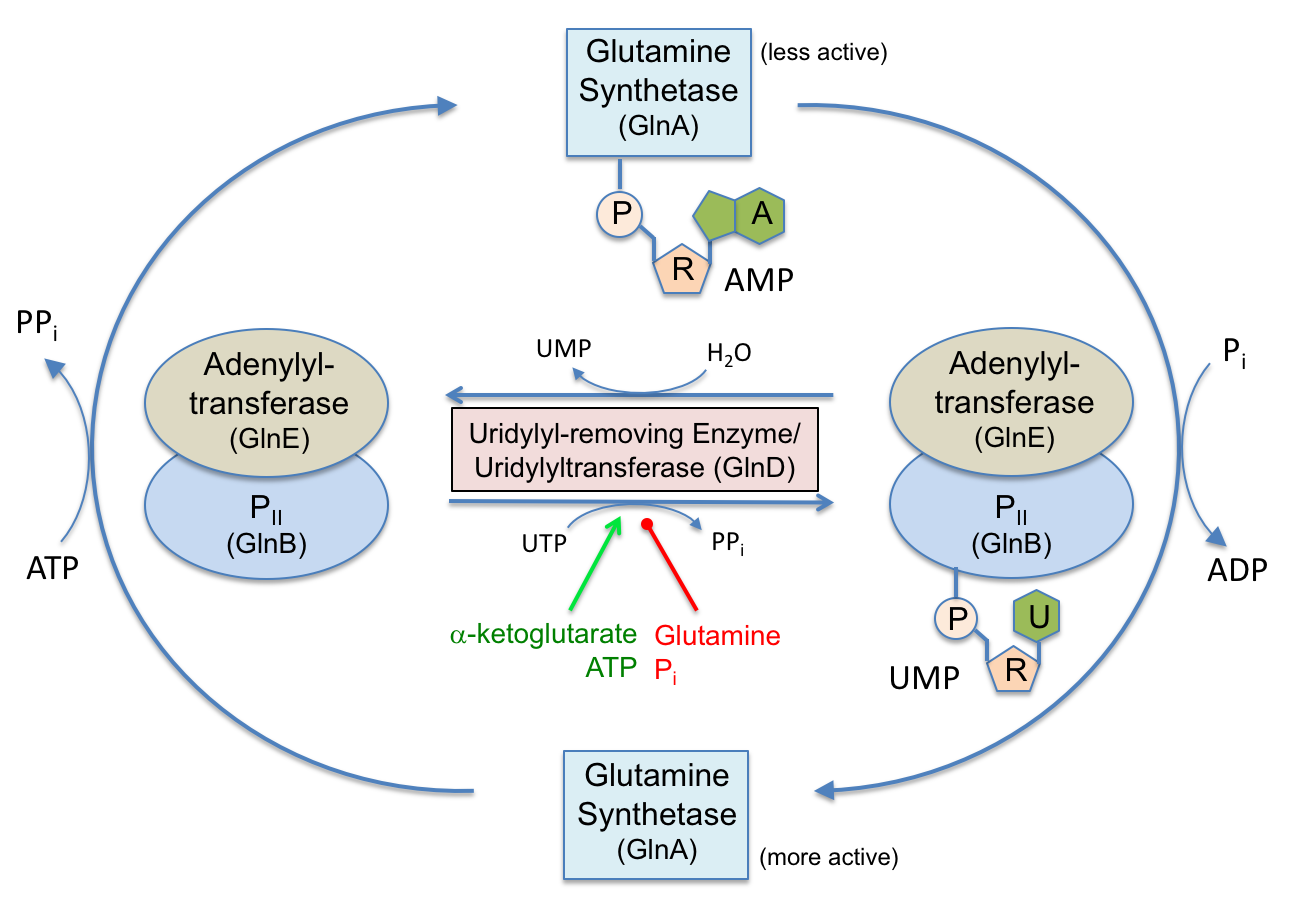
Regulation of bacterial glutamine synthase (GlnA) by adenylylation and (indirectly) by uridylylation. Uridylyltransferase (GlnD) uridylylates the regulatory PII protein (GlnB) which determines whether adenylyltransferase (GlnE) adenylylates or de-adenylylates glutamine synthase. GlnD is a bifunctional enzyme that both attaches and removes UMP from GlnB. GlnD is activated by α-ketoglutarate and ATP (green) but inhibited by glutamine and inorganic phosphate (P_{i}, in red). The protein names are those in E. coli. Homologs in other bacteria may have different names.

Nucleotidyltransferases are transferase enzymes of phosphorus-containing groups, e.g., substituents of nucleotidylic acids or simply nucleoside monophosphates. The general reaction of transferring a nucleoside monophosphate moiety from A to B, can be written as:

A-P-N + B $\rightleftharpoons$ A + B-P-N

For example, in the case of polymerases, A is pyrophosphate and B is the nascent polynucleotide. They are classified under EC number 2.7.7 and they can be categorised into:

1. Uridylyltransferases, which transfer uridylyl- groups
2. Adenylyltransferases, which transfer adenylyl- groups
3. Guanylyltransferases, which transfer guanylyl- groups
4. Cytitidylyltransferases, which transfer cytidylyl- groups
5. Thymidylyltransferases, which transfer thymidylyl- groups

== Role in metabolism ==
Many metabolic enzymes are modified by nucleotidyltransferases. The attachment of an AMP (adenylylation) or UMP (uridylylation) can activate or inactivate an enzyme or change its specificity (see figure). These modifications can lead to intricate regulatory networks that can finely tune enzymatic activities so that only the needed compounds are made (here: glutamine).

== Role in DNA repair mechanisms ==
Nucleotidyl transferase is a component of the repair pathway for single nucleotide base excision repair. This repair mechanism begins when a single nucleotide is recognized by DNA glycosylase as incorrectly matched or has been mutated in some way (UV light, chemical mutagen, etc.), and is removed. Later, a nucleotidyl transferase is used to fill in the gap with the correct base, using the template strand as the reference.
