= Nonsense-mediated mRNA decay =

Elimination of mRNA with premature stop codons in eukaryotes

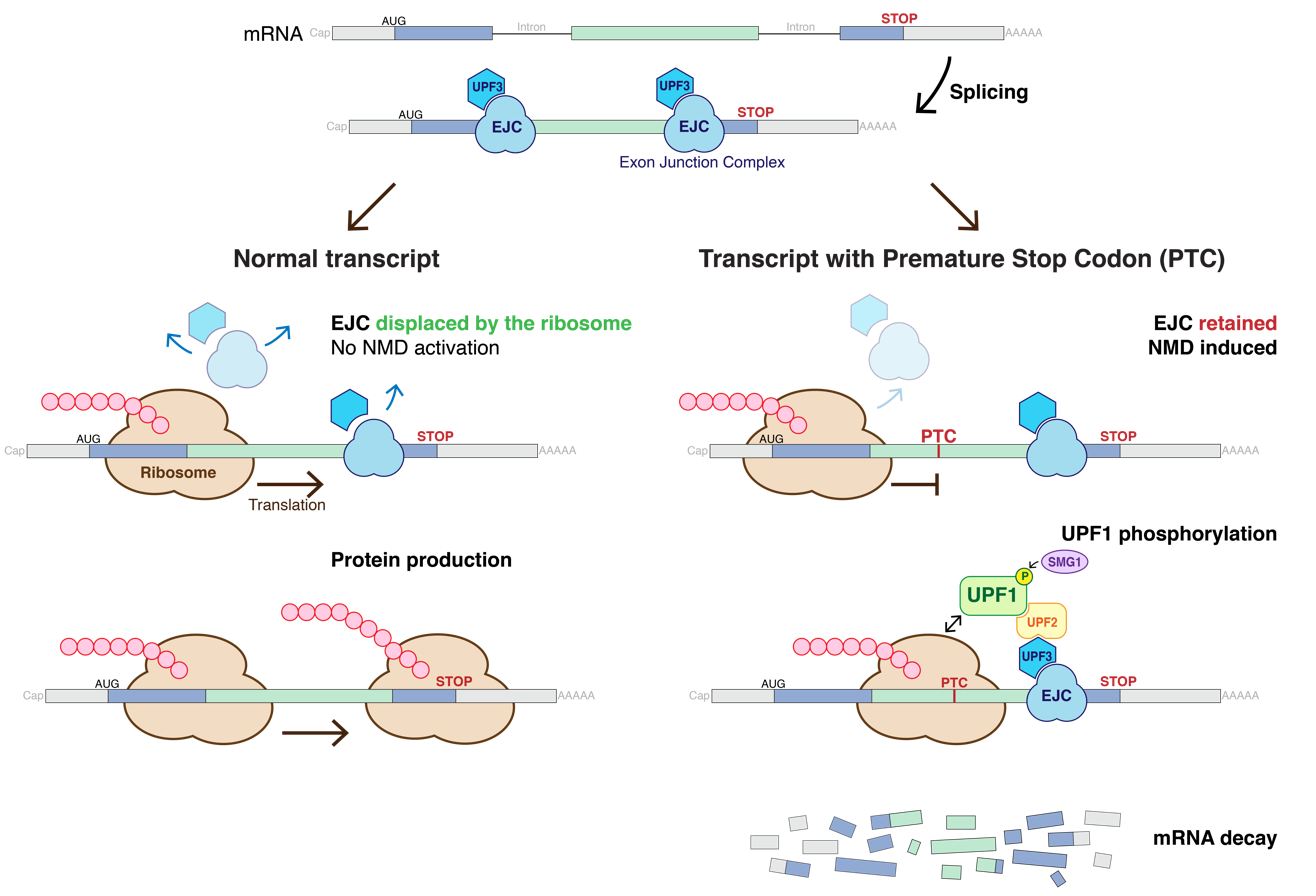
Canonical NMD pathway (in humans)

Nonsense-mediated mRNA decay (NMD) is a surveillance pathway that likely exists in all eukaryotes. Its main function is to reduce errors in gene expression by eliminating mRNA transcripts that contain premature stop codons. Translation of these aberrant mRNAs could, in some cases, lead to deleterious gain-of-function or dominant-negative activity of the resulting proteins.

NMD was first described in 1979 in yeast, and in 1981 in human cells which suggests broad phylogenetic conservation and an important biological role. NMD was discovered when it was observed that cells often contain unexpectedly low concentrations of mRNAs that are transcribed from alleles carrying nonsense mutations. Nonsense mutations code for a premature stop codon which causes the protein to be shortened. The truncated protein may or may not be functional, depending on the importance of the residues that are not translated. In human genetics, NMD has the potential not only to limit the translation of abnormal proteins but also to occasionally cause detrimental effects in specific genetic mutations.

NMD regulates numerous biological functions in a diverse range of cells, such as contributing to the synaptic plasticity of neurons which shapes adult behavior.

== Pathway ==
While many of the proteins involved in NMD are not conserved between species, in Saccharomyces cerevisiae (brewer's yeast), the pathway has three main factors: UPF1, UPF2, and UPF3 (UPF3A and UPF3B in humans), which make up the conserved core of the NMD pathway. All three of these factors are trans-acting elements called up-frameshift (UPF) proteins. In mammals, UPF2 and UPF3 are part of the exon–exon junction complex (EJC) that remains bound to mRNA after splicing, along with other proteins, including eIF4AIII, MLN51, and the Y14/MAGOH heterodimer, which also function in NMD. UPF1 phosphorylation is controlled by the proteins SMG1, SMG5, SMG6, and SMG7.

The process of detecting aberrant transcripts occurs during translation of the mRNA. A popular model for the detection of aberrant transcripts in mammals suggests that during the first round of translation, the ribosome removes the exon–exon junction complexes (EJCs) that were bound to the mRNA during splicing. If any of these proteins remain bound to the mRNA after this first round of translation, NMD is activated. EJCs located downstream of a stop codon are not removed from the transcript because the ribosome is released before reaching them, so transcripts to which EJCs remain attached after translation are almost invariably the product of a nonsense mutation. Termination of translation leads to the assembly of a complex composed of UPF1, SMG1 and the release factors, eRF1 and eRF3, on the mRNA. If an EJC is left on the mRNA because the transcript contains a premature stop codon, then UPF1 comes into contact with UPF2 and UPF3, triggering the phosphorylation of UPF1. In vertebrates, the location of the last EJC relative to the termination codon usually determines whether the transcript will be subjected to NMD or not. If the termination codon is downstream of or within about 50 nucleotides of the final EJC then the transcript is translated normally. However, if the termination codon is further than about 50 nucleotides upstream of any EJCs, then the transcript is downregulated by NMD. The phosphorylated UPF1 then interacts with SMG5, SMG6, and SMG7, which promote the dephosphorylation of UPF1. SMG7 is thought to be the terminating effector in NMD, as it accumulates in P-bodies, which are cytoplasmic sites for mRNA decay. In both yeast and human cells, the major pathway for mRNA decay is initiated by the removal of the 5' cap followed by degradation by XRN1, an exoribonuclease enzyme. The other pathway by which mRNA is degraded is by deadenylation in the 3'-to-5' direction.

In addition to the well-recognized role of NMD in removing aberrant transcripts, there are transcripts that contain introns within their 3' untranslated regions (UTRs). These messages are predicted to be NMD targets yet a few examples (e.g. activity-regulated cytoskeleton-associated protein, known as ARC) appear to have crucial biological functions, suggesting that NMD may have physiologically relevant roles.

== Mechanism and regulation ==
NMD is a cellular mechanism that degrades mRNAs containing premature termination codons (PTCs), which can arise from mutations in the genomic template. Comprehensive analyses of large-scale genetics and gene expression datasets have enabled the systematic identification of NMD and its efficiency.

1. EJC model: NMD is typically triggered when a PTC is located upstream of the last exon junction complex (EJC). If the PTC is downstream of the last EJC, NMD is often inefficient.
2. Start-proximal effect: PTCs located near the start codon can evade NMD. This evasion is associated with the presence of downstream in-frame stop codons, which can allow the ribosome to bypass the PTC and continue translation.
3. Exon length and distance to normal stop codon: Long exons and large distances between the PTC and the normal stop codon are associated with inefficient NMD. This suggests that the spatial configuration of the mRNA can influence the accessibility of NMD machinery.
4. mRNA turnover rate: Transcripts with rapid turnover rates tend to attenuate the effects of NMD. This means that mRNAs that are quickly degraded by other mechanisms may not be efficiently targeted by NMD.
5. RNA-binding protein motifs: Certain RNA-binding protein motifs near the PTC or within the 3′UTR can modulate NMD efficiency. These motifs can either enhance or inhibit the recognition of PTCs by NMD machinery, depending on their specific interactions with NMD factors.
6. Generalized frameshift: As a response to poor nutritional conditions, the bulk of the yeast transcriptome undergoes −1 ribosomal frameshifts which leads to an accelerated co-translational mRNA decay. Under such conditions NMD-dependent degradation represents at least one-third of the total mRNA decay. Less optimal codons are a key factor for ribosomes to induce out-of-frame mRNA decay. This mechanism appears to be conserved from bacteria to humans.

== Mutations ==
Although nonsense-mediated mRNA decay reduces nonsense codons, mutations can occur that lead to various health problems and diseases in humans. A dominant-negative or deleterious gain-of-function mutation can occur if premature terminating (nonsense) codons are translated. NMD is becoming increasingly evident in the way it modifies phenotypic consequences because of the broad variety of its influences on gene expression. For instance, the blood disorder Beta thalassemia is inherited and caused by mutations within the upstream region of the β-globin gene. An individual carrying only one affected allele will have no or extremely low levels of the mutant β-globin mRNA. An even more severe form of the disease called thalassemia intermedia or 'inclusion body' thalassemia can also occur: instead of decreased mRNA levels, a mutant transcript produces truncated β chains, which in turn leads to a clinical phenotype in the heterozygote.

Nonsense-mediated decay mutations can also contribute to Marfan syndrome. This disorder is caused by mutations in the fibrillin-1 (FBN1) gene and results from a dominant-negative interaction between mutant and wild-type fibrillin-1 gene.

=== Regulating immunogenic frameshift-derived antigens ===
NMD plays a role in the regulation of immunogenic frameshift-derived antigens. Frameshift mutations often result in the production of aberrant proteins that can be recognized as neoantigens by the immune system, particularly in cancer cells. However, frameshift mutations often lead to the translation of an out-of-frame PTC that can activate NMD to degrade these mutant mRNAs before they are translated into proteins, thereby reducing the presentation of these potentially immunogenic peptides on the cell surface via HLA class I molecules. This modulation of immunogenicity means that frameshift-derived neoantigens only contribute to the response to immune checkpoint inhibition if they arise from mutations in parts of the genome that are not recognized by NMD.

== Research applications ==
This pathway has a significant effect in the way genes are translated, restricting the amount of gene expression. It is still a new field in genetics, but its role in research has already led scientists to uncover numerous explanations for gene regulation. Studying nonsense-mediated decay has allowed scientists to determine the causes for certain heritable diseases and dosage compensation in mammals.

=== Heritable diseases ===
The proopiomelanocortin gene (POMC) is expressed in the hypothalamus, in the pituitary gland. It yields a range of biologically active peptides and hormones and undergoes tissue-specific post-translational processing to yield a range of biologically active peptides producing adrenocorticotropic hormone (ACTH), β-endorphin, and a-, b- and c-melanocyte-stimulating hormone (MSH). These peptides then interact with different melanocortin receptors (MCRs) and are involved in a wide range of processes including the regulation of body weight (MC3R and MC4R), adrenal steroidogenesis (MC2R), and hair pigmentation (MC1R). According to a study by the British Association of Dermatologists in 2012, the lack of a red hair phenotype in a North-African obese child homozygous for a novel POMC null mutation showed nonsense-mediated decay RNA evaluation in a hair pigment chemical analysis. They found that inactivating the POMC gene mutation results in obesity, adrenal insufficiency, and red hair. This has been seen in both humans and mice. In this experiment they described a 3-year-old boy from Rome, Italy. He was selected as a subject in the study because he had Addison's disease and early-onset obesity. They collected his DNA and amplified it using PCR. Sequencing analysis revealed a homozygous single substitution determining a stop codon. This caused an aberrant protein and the corresponding amino acid sequence indicated the exact position of the homozygous nucleotide. The substitution was localized in exon 3 and the nonsense mutation was positioned at codon 68. The results from this experiment strongly suggest that the absence of red hair in non-European patients with early-onset obesity and hormone deficiency does not exclude the occurrence of POMC mutations. By sequencing the patient's DNA they found that this novel mutation produces a variety of symptoms because of a malfunctioning nonsense-mediated mRNA decay surveillance pathway.

=== Dosage compensation ===
There has been evidence that the nonsense-mediated mRNA decay pathway participates in X chromosome dosage compensation in mammals. In higher eukaryotes with dimorphic sex chromosomes, such as humans and fruit flies, males have one X chromosome, whereas females have two. These organisms have evolved a mechanism that compensates not only for the different number of sex chromosomes between the two sexes, but also for the differing X/autosome ratios. In this genome-wide survey, the scientists found that autosomal genes are more likely to undergo nonsense-mediated decay than X-linked genes. This is because NMD fine tunes X chromosomes and it was demonstrated by inhibiting the pathway. The results were that balanced gene expression between X and autosomes gene expression was decreased by 10–15% no matter the method of inhibition. The NMD pathway is skewed towards depressing expression of larger population or autosomal genes than x-linked ones. In conclusion, the data supports the view that the coupling of alternative splicing and NMD is a pervasive means of gene expression regulation.

=== Designing CRISPR-Cas9 experiments ===
The implications of NMD are significant when designing CRISPR-Cas9 experiments, particularly those aimed at gene inactivation. CRISPR-Cas9 introduces double-strand breaks that can lead to insertions or deletions (indels), often resulting in frameshift mutations and PTCs. If these PTCs are located in regions that trigger NMD, the resulting mRNAs will be rapidly degraded, leading to effective gene knockdown. However, if the PTCs are in regions that evade NMD, the mutant mRNAs may be translated into truncated proteins, potentially retaining partial function and leading to incomplete gene inactivation. Therefore, understanding and incorporating NMD rules into the design of single guide RNAs (sgRNAs) is essential for achieving desired outcomes in CRISPR-Cas9 experiments. Tools such as NMDetective can predict the likelihood of NMD triggering based on the location of PTCs, thereby aiding in the design of more effective gene-editing strategies.

== See also ==
- Non-stop decay, another mRNA surveillance mechanism
- mRNA surveillance
