= Cap binding complex =

Formation on 5' ends of mRNAs

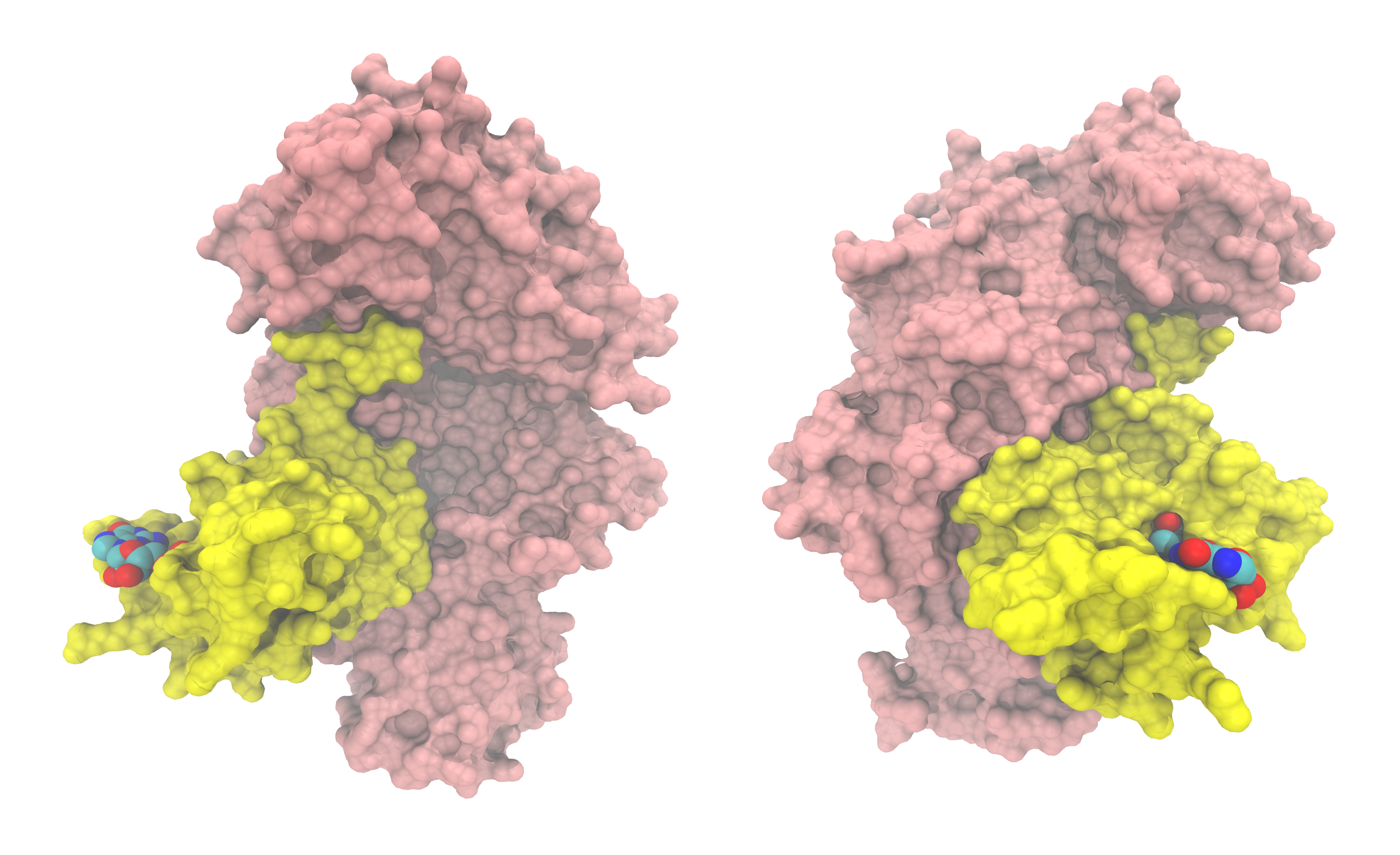
Surface model of the cap-binding complex (heavy chain pink, light chain yellow, m7G and GDP as balls), after PDB 1H2T.

The 5' cap of eukaryotic messenger RNA is bound at all times by various cap-binding complexes (CBCs).

== Nuclear cap-binding complex ==
In the nucleus, freshly transcribed mRNA molecules are bound on the 5' cap by the nuclear cap-binding complex of Cbc1/Cbc2 in yeast or CBP20/CBP80 in metazoans. These aid in the export of the mRNA and protect it from decapping. They also serve as a marker for the so-called pioneer round of translation when the message is examined by nonsense mediated decay.

== Cytoplasmic cap-binding complex ==
After the first round of translation ("pioneer round"), CBC20/80 is replaced by the translation initiation factor eIF4E. The eIF4F complex (eIF4E, eIF4G and eIF4A) then regulates translation in response to the state of the cell via its phosphorylation state and again protects the message from decapping.

== Decapping complex ==
When translationally repressed or marked for decay by various mechanisms the 5' cap is bound by the mRNA decapping enzyme DCP2. A host of proteins accompany it including UPF1, UPF2, UPF3A, Dcp1, Dhh1, XRN1, and others. The decapping enzyme removes the 5' cap leading to destruction of the message.
