= SMG6 =

Protein-coding gene in the species Homo sapiens

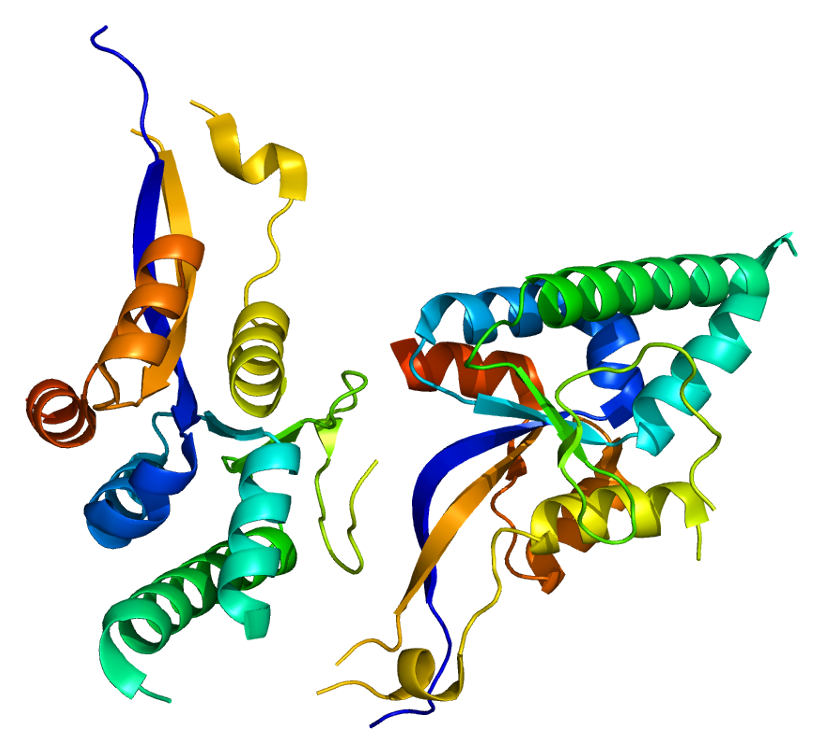

Identifiers
- Aliases: SMG6, C17orf31, EST1A, SMG-6, hSMG5/7a, nonsense mediated mRNA decay factor, SMG6 nonsense mediated mRNA decay factor, hEST1A
- External IDs: OMIM: 610963; MGI: 2144117; GeneCards: SMG6
Available structures
PDB	Ortholog search: PDBe RCSB
PDB	List of PDB id codes 2DOK, 2HWW, 2HWX, 4UM2

Gene location (Human)
Chr.	Chromosome 17 (human)
Band	17p13.3	Start	2,059,839 bp
Band	17p13.3	End	2,303,785 bp

Gene location (Mouse)
Chr.	Chromosome 11 (mouse)
Band	11|11 B5	Start	74,816,649 bp
Band	11|11 B5	End	75,055,274 bp
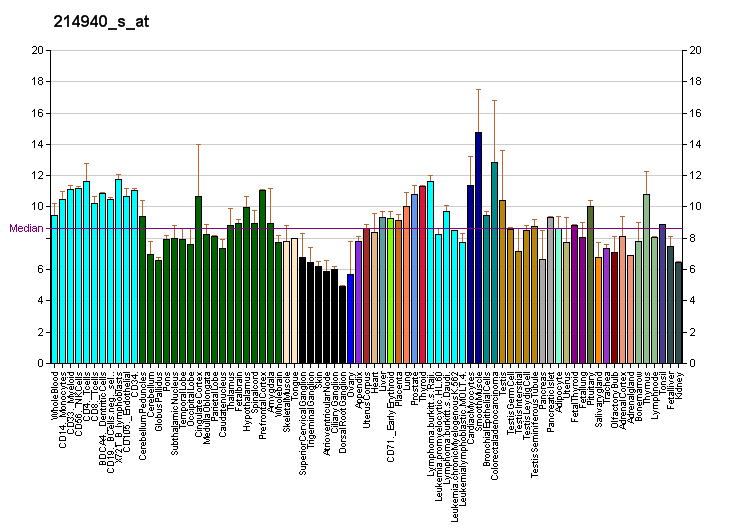
RNA expression pattern
Bgee	Human / Mouse (ortholog); Top expressed in: stromal cell of endometrium; left ovary; right testis; right ovary; left testis; body of uterus; ventricular zone; anterior pituitary; ganglionic eminence; right hemisphere of cerebellum / Top expressed in: spermatid; ascending aorta; aortic valve; spermatocyte; genital tubercle; tail of embryo; supraoptic nucleus; secondary oocyte; ventricular zone; Rostral migratory stream; More reference expression data
BioGPS	More reference expression data
Gene ontology
Molecular function	DNA binding; telomeric DNA binding; metal ion binding; DNA polymerase binding; protein binding; nuclease activity; endonuclease activity; hydrolase activity; telomerase RNA binding; endoribonuclease activity; RNA binding; ribonucleoprotein complex binding; ribonuclease activity
Cellular component	cytoplasm; cytosol; exon-exon junction complex; chromosome; telomere; telomerase catalytic core complex; nucleolus; telomerase holoenzyme complex; nucleus
Biological process	nucleic acid phosphodiester bond hydrolysis; mRNA export from nucleus; negative regulation of telomere capping; regulation of dephosphorylation; nuclear-transcribed mRNA catabolic process, nonsense-mediated decay; RNA phosphodiester bond hydrolysis, endonucleolytic; regulation of RNA stability; regulation of telomere maintenance; regulation of telomere maintenance via telomerase; regulation of telomerase activity; telomere maintenance via telomerase; RNA phosphodiester bond hydrolysis
Sources:Amigo / QuickGO
Orthologs
Databases	NCBI: entry; OMA: entry
Species	Human	Mouse
Entrez	23293	103677
Ensembl	ENSG00000070366	ENSMUSG00000038290
UniProt	Q86US8	P61406
RefSeq (mRNA)	NM_001170957; NM_001256827; NM_001256828; NM_001282326; NM_017575	NM_001002764
RefSeq (protein)	NP_001243756; NP_001243757; NP_001269255; NP_060045	NP_001002764
Location (UCSC)	Chr 17: 2.06 – 2.3 Mb	Chr 11: 74.82 – 75.06 Mb
PubMed search
- Wikidata
View/Edit Human	View/Edit Mouse

Telomerase-binding protein EST1A is an enzyme that in humans is encoded by the SMG6 gene on chromosome 17. It is ubiquitously expressed in many tissues and cell types. The C-terminus of the EST1A protein contains a PilT N-terminus (PIN) domain. This structure for this domain has been determined by X-ray crystallography. SMG6 functions to bind single-stranded DNA in telomere maintenance and single-stranded RNA in nonsense-mediated mRNA decay (NMD). The SMG6 gene also contains one of 27 SNPs associated with increased risk of coronary artery disease.

== Structure ==
=== Gene ===
The SMG6 gene resides on chromosome 17 at the band 17p13.3 and contains 30 exons. This gene produces 3 isoforms through alternative splicing.

=== Protein ===
SMG6 is one of three human homologs for Est1p found in Saccharomyces cerevisiae. It contains a PIN domain, which is characteristic of proteins with ribonuclease activity. The PIN domain forms an alpha/beta fold structure that similar to that found in 5' nucleases. Within the PIN domain is a canonical triad of acidic residues that functions to cleave single-stranded RNA. SMG6 also shares a phosphoserine-binding domain resembling the one in 14–3–3 proteins with its other two homologs, SMG5 and SMG7. This 14–3–3-like domain and a C-terminal helical hairpins domain with seven α-helices stacked perpendicular to the 14–3–3-like domain together form a monomeric tetratricopeptide region (TPR). Differences in the orientation and specific residues in the TPR between SMG6 and its homologs may account for why SMG6 does not form a complex with SMG5 and SMG7 when recruited by UPF1.

== Function ==
SMG6 is broadly expressed in all human tissues. It has dual functions in telomere maintenance and RNA surveillance pathways. SMG6 binds single-stranded telomere DNA and cooperates with telomerase reverse transcriptase to lengthen telomeres. Overexpression of SMG6 induces anaphase bridges due to chromosome-end fusions and, thus, affects telomere capping, which may directly induce an apoptotic response. SMG6 also functions as an endonuclease in the NMD pathway. The catalytic activity of SMG6 resides in its PIN domain, which is required for the degradation of premature translation termination codons (PTC)-containing mRNAs in human cells. SMG6 cleaves mRNA near the premature translocation-termination codons and requires UPF1 and SMG1 to reduce reporter mRNA levels.

== Clinical significance ==
In humans, selected genomic regions based on 150 SNPs were identified in a genome-wide association study (GWAS) on coronary artery disease. Accordingly, the association between recent smoking and the CpG sites within and near these coronary artery disease-related genes were investigated in 724 Caucasian subjects from the Rotterdam Study. The identified methylation sites were found in SMG6 together with other genes, and several of these sites exhibited lower methylation in subjects currently smoking compared to never smoking.

=== Clinical marker ===
A multi-locus genetic risk score study based on a combination of 27 loci, including the SMG6 gene, identified individuals at increased risk for both incident and recurrent coronary artery disease events, as well as an enhanced clinical benefit from statin therapy. The study was based on a community cohort study (the Malmo Diet and Cancer study) and four additional randomized controlled trials of primary prevention cohorts (JUPITER and ASCOT) and secondary prevention cohorts (CARE and PROVE IT-TIMI 22).
