= Staufen-mediated mRNA decay =

Metabolic pathway leading to mRNA degradation

Staufen-mediated mRNA decay (SMD) is a metabolic pathway that leads to degradation of specific mRNA transcripts mediated by Staufen protein. According to bioinformatic predictations, more than 1,000 mRNA transcripts could potentially be target by SMD. SMD occurs when SMD factors (like UPF1 and UPF2) bind to staufen in stem-loop elements of the 3'UTR.

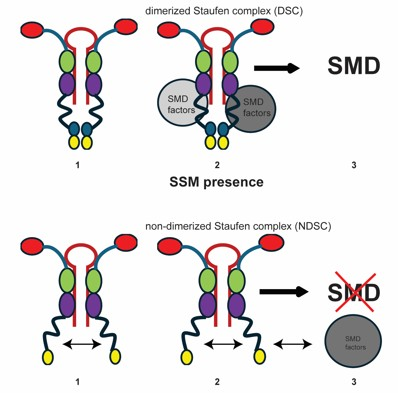
Staufen-mediated mRNA decay

SMD factors like UPF1 and UPF2 factors cleave the mRNAs bound to Staufen.

== Discovery ==
Staufen was previously known to interact and transport mRNA into the cytoplasm in Drosophila melanogaster. This protein was also known to activate gene expression in Oskar gene once it is localized in Drosophila posterior pole. Staufen null mutants in Drosophila malanogaster are alive, but their embryos failed to develop living flies, therefore, the name comes after Staufen dynasty where all male offsprings died before reproducing.

However, the exact mechanisms used by Staufen to affect gene expression were unknown. Finally in 2005, Staufen-mediated mRNA decay was identified when a protein known to be involved in a similar metabolism (non-sense mediated mRNA decay) was bound to Staufen.

== Mechanism ==
SMD occurs when staufen protein binds to an mRNA and recruits SMD factors (UPF1, UPF2) that degrade the RNA molecule bound to Staufen. SMD may involve gene expression in more than 1000 mRNA transcripts. SMD is reported to be a stepwise process: 1) two Staufen protein particles bind target mRNA by their double-stranded RNA binding domain (dsRBD) 3 and 4, 2) the two Staufen particles dimerizes by establishing non-covalent interactions between their Staufen-swapping motif (SSM) and dsRBD5 located in their C' termini, 3) this dimerized staufen complex is recognized by SMD factors (i.e. UPF1, UPF2). It was reported that, upon SSM deletion, staufen particles bind to target mRNA but fail to dimerize and form a non-dimerized staufen complex. This complex inhibits SMD.
