= Staufen (protein) =

Protein product of a maternally expressed gene

Maternal effect protein staufen

Identifiers
- Organism: Drosophila melanogaster
- Symbol: stau
- Entrez: 37065
- Orthologs: NCBI: entry; OMA: entry
- PDB: 5CFF
- RefSeq (mRNA): NM_057403
- RefSeq (Prot): NP_476751.1
- UniProt: P25159

Other data
- Chromosome: 2R: 18.12 - 18.13 Mb
Search for
- Structures: Swiss-model
- Domains: InterPro

Staufen is a protein product of a maternally expressed gene first identified in Drosophila melanogaster. The protein has been implicated in helping regulate genes important in determination of gradients that set up the anterior posterior axis such as bicoid and oskar. Staufen proteins, abbreviated Stau, are necessary for cell localization during the oogenesis and zygotic development. It is involved in targeting of the messenger RNA encoding these genes to the correct pole of the egg cell.

Human homologs of this protein include Staufen1 (STAU1) and Staufen2 STAU2.

== Origin of the name ==
It was observed that Staufen mutants in Drosophila melanogaster failed to produce developing embryos. Therefore, the name "Staufen" comes after the Staufen dynasty, where all male offspring for several reasons died before reproducing.

== Forms ==
Staufen proteins are categorized under a family of double stranded RNA-binding proteins. Many homologs of Staufen proteins exist depending on the organism. The mammalian homologs of Staufen include STAU1 and STAU2. The gene encoding the STAU1 protein is found along the long arm of chromosome 20, while the gene encoding STAU2 is found on chromosome 8. These proteins are identified by the presence of double-stranded RNA binding domains (dsRNA- binding domains), which functions to bind the protein to double-stranded secondary structure RNAs. These two orthologues are produced in several different isoforms following pre mRNA splicing. STAU1 is predominantly expressed in most cell types, while STAU2 is conserved the brain, with low level expression in other cell tissues.

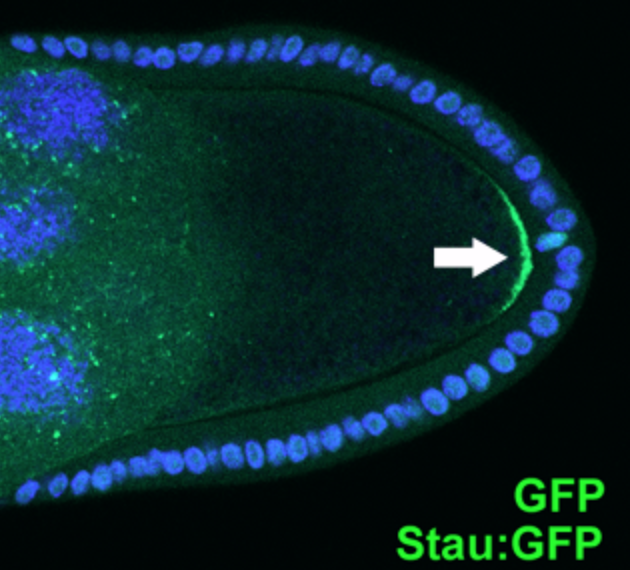
Localization of Staufen (Stau:GFP) in Drosophila stage 9 oocytes (white arrow).

== Functions ==
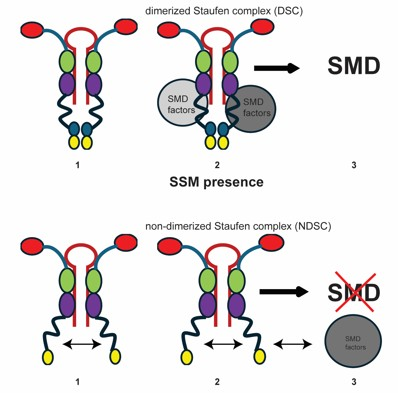
Staufen-mediated mRNA decay.

Staufen proteins are encoded and produced very early in oogenesis. At the primary stages of oogenesis, Staufen mRNA is evenly dispersed throughout the cytoplasm of the cell. As the oocyte develops, the proteins condense at the anterior margins and the posterior pole of the egg cell. In Drosophila the proteins are necessary for the translating and transporting oskar mRNA to the posterior pole of the oocyte. Similarly Staufen proteins are also part of a multistep process that localizes Bicoid mRNA to the anterior end of the early embryo, and these proteins are also responsible for asymmetric dispersion of prospero mRNA as the embryonic neuroblast divides.

In mammals, the STAU proteins contain a microtubule-binding domain, giving the protein the capability to bind to Tubulin. Research has also shown that these proteins maintain an association with the Rough endoplasmic reticulum (RER), suggesting that transport of mRNA through the use of Staufen proteins is facilitated via the microtubule network to the rough endoplasmic reticulum.

Staufen is also known to induce Staufen-mediated mRNA decay (SMD). SMD occurs when Staufen protein binds to an mRNA and recruits SMD factors (i.e. UPF1, UPF2) that degrade the RNA molecule bound to Staufen. SMD potently affects metabolism because it is reported to involve gene expression in more than 1000 mRNA transcripts. SMD is reported to be a stepwise process: 1) two Staufen protein particles bind target mRNA by their double-stranded RNA binding domain (dsRBD) 3 and 4, 2) the two Staufen particles dimerizes by establishing non-covalent interactions between their Staufen-swapping motif (SSM) and dsRBD5 located in their C' termini, 3) this dimerized Staufen complex is recognized by SMD factors (i.e. UPF1, UPF2). It was reported that, upon SSM deletion, Staufen particles bind to target mRNA but fail to dimerize and form a non-dimerized Staufen complex. This complex inhibits SMD.
