= Exon junction complex =

Protein complex assembled on mRNA

An exon junction complex (EJC) is a protein complex which forms on a pre-messenger RNA strand at the junction of two exons which have been joined together during RNA splicing. The EJC has major influences on translation, surveillance, localization of the spliced mRNA, and m^{6}A methylation. It is first deposited onto mRNA during splicing and is then transported into the cytoplasm. There it plays a major role in post-transcriptional regulation of mRNA. It is believed that exon junction complexes provide a position-specific memory of the splicing event. The EJC consists of a stable heterotetramer core, which serves as a binding platform for other factors necessary for the mRNA pathway. The core of the EJC contains the protein eukaryotic initiation factor 4A-III (eIF4A-III; a DEAD-box RNA helicase) bound to an adenosine triphosphate (ATP) analog, as well as the additional proteins Magoh and Y14. The binding of these proteins to nuclear speckled domains has been measured recently and it may be regulated by PI3K/AKT/mTOR signaling pathways. In order for the binding of the complex to the mRNA to occur, the eIF4AIII factor is inhibited, stopping the hydrolysis of ATP. This recognizes EJC as an ATP dependent complex. EJC also interacts with a large number of additional proteins; most notably SR proteins. These interactions are suggested to be important for mRNA compaction. The role of EJC in mRNA export is controversial.

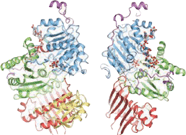
2.3 angstrom resolution structure of a core EJC complex bound to an RNA transcript

== Protein components ==
The EJC is made up of several key protein components: RNPS1, Y14, SRm160, Aly/REF and Magoh, among others. RNPS1 can function as a coactivator of splicing, but along with Y14, it also takes part in the process of nonsense-mediated decay in eukaryotes. SRm160 is another coactivator that has been proposed to enhance mRNA 3’ end processing. The protein component Magoh is thought to facilitate the subcytoplasmic localization of mRNAs while Aly is engaged in nuclear mRNA export. Aly is believed to be recruited to the exon junction complex by the protein UAP56. UAP56 is recognized as an RNA helicase but acts as a splicing factor required for early spliceosome assembly. Another factor involved in the EJC pathway is DEK. This component is known to take part in a variety of functions ranging from splicing to transcriptional regulation and chromatin structure.

== Structure ==
The crystallization of the exon junction complex has revealed the structural organization of its protein components. The core of the complex is elongated with an overall dimension of 99Å by 67Å by 54Å. It is organized around the eIF4AIII factor. The factor itself consists of two different types of conformations around the mRNA: closed and open. In a closed state, the two domains of eIF4AIII form composite binding sites for the 5'-adenylyl-β,γ-imidodiphosphate (ADPNP) and mRNA. In the open conformation, the two domains are rotated by 160 degrees relative to closed state. The protein components Magoh and Y14 bind together to form a heterodimer located at the 5’ pole of the EJC. Magoh binds to an eIF4AIII domain through interactions between residues from its two C-terminal helices and one end of a large β-sheet. Conserved residues in the linker between the two eIF4AIII domains form salt bridges or hydrogen bonds with specific residues in Magoh. Other bonding occurs between the second loop of the Magoh β–sheet and the two eIF4AIII domains and their linker. There is only a single partial bond formed between Y14 and eIF4AIII. This consists of a salt bridge between the conserved residues Y14 Arg108 and eIF4AIII Asp401. If mutations were to occur to both of these residues, association of Magoh-Y14 with EJC would be non-existent.

== Mechanism ==
During the second step of splicing in eukaryotic cells, the EJC is deposited approximately 20-24 nucleotides from the 5’ end upstream of the splice junction (where two exons are joined), when the lariat has formed and the exons are ligated together. The binding of the EJC to the mRNA occurs in a sequence independent manner, to form the mature messenger ribonucleoprotein (mRNP). The EJC remains stably bound to this mRNP as it is exported out of the nucleus and into the cytoplasm. Protein components are either bound to or released by the EJC as it is transported. In order for the translocation of mRNAs through the nuclear pore complex to occur, a heterodimer consisting of NXF1/TAP and NXT1/p15 must bind to the transcripts. NXF1/TAP is a major receptor for the export of mRNAs to the cytoplasm. This is because it interacts with both RNA-binding adapter proteins and components of the nuclear pore complex.

Recognition of a premature termination codon occurs during translation in the cytoplasm. The image shown below implies that this event is nuclear, contrary to the general view in this field. Readers should be aware that translation in the nucleus is a highly controversial subject that is not well-supported by data.

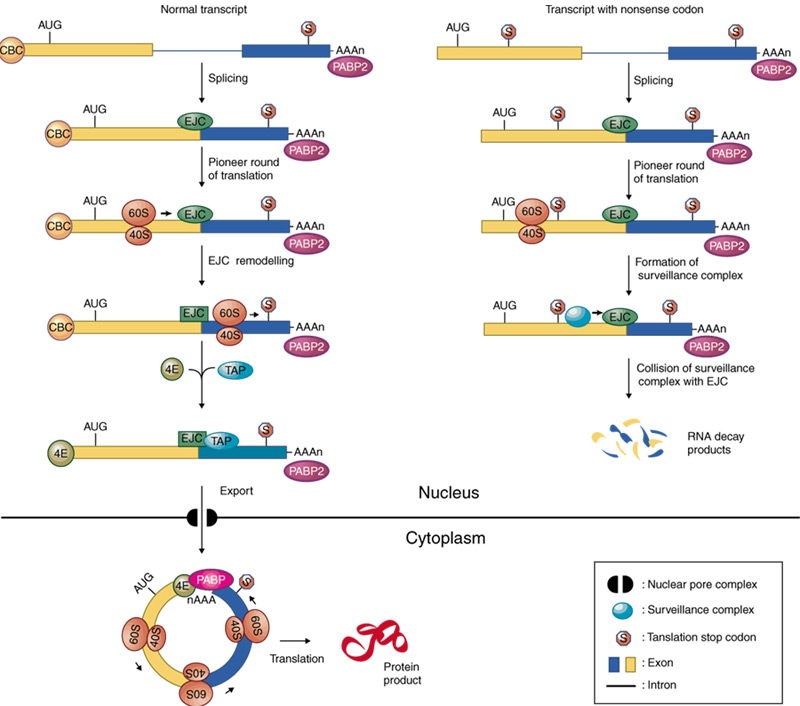
PTC causes mRNA transcript to undergo NMD

== In nonsense mediated decay ==
Exon junction complexes play a major role in mRNA surveillance. More specifically, they are found in the nonsense mediated decay pathway (NMD), wherein mRNA transcripts with premature stop codons are degraded. In normal mRNA translation, the ribosome binds to the transcript and begins amino acid chain elongation. It continues on until it reaches the location of the exon junction complex, which it then displaces. Next, translation is complete when the ribosome reaches a termination codon. In NMD, the mRNA transcript contains a premature termination codon (PTC) due to a nonsense mutation. If this codon occurs prior to the EJC site, the EJC will remain bound, triggering mRNA decay. The EJC and its position serve as a type of regulator, determining whether the transcript is defective or not.

EJCs are also known to take part in NMD in another way; the recruitment of the surveillance factors UPF1, UPF2 and UPF3. These proteins are the most important components of the NMD mechanism. The EJC protein MAGOH, Y14 and eIF4AIII provide a binding for UPF3, which acts as a bridge between UPF2 and UPF1 forming a trimeric complex. Within this complex, UPF2 and UPF3 act cooperatively to promote ATPase and RNA helicase of UPF1. The EJC core stably anchors the UPF complex to the mRNA, and aids in regulation of essential UPF1 protein. Ribosomes which are stalled on a PTC recruit UPF1 through interactions with the release factor eRF1 and eRF3. Along with the protein SMG1, eRF1, eRF3 and UPF1 form the complex SURF. This complex forms a bridge between the ribosome and the downstream EJC which is associated with UPF3 and UPF2. This interaction triggers the phosphorylation of UPF1 by SMG1, causing the dissociation of eRF1 and eRF3. The complex produced consists of EJC, UPF3, UPF2, phosphorylated UPF1 and SMG1 and in turn triggers degradation of the mRNA.
