= Gertrud Schüpbach =

Swiss-American molecular biologist (born 1950)

- Born: Gertrud M. Schüpbach; February 3, 1950 (age 76); Zürich, Switzerland
- Other name: Trudi Schüpbach
- Education: University of Zürich (PhD)
- Known for: Studies of signaling pathways in pattern formation in embryonic development
- Spouse: Eric F. Wieschaus
- Awards: Honorary Degree, University of Zürich; Edwin Grant Conklin Medal, Society for Developmental Biology
- Scientific career
- Fields: Molecular biology, genetics
- Workplaces: University of Zürich, Princeton University

Trudi Schüpbach (born Zurich, Switzerland, February 3, 1950; full name Gertrud M. Schüpbach; published name Trudi Schüpbach) is a Swiss-American molecular biologist. She is an Emeritus Professor of Molecular Biology as well as Emeritus Henry Fairfield Osborn Professor of Biology at Princeton University, where her laboratory studies molecular and genetic mechanisms in fruit fly (Drosophila melanogaster) oogenesis.

== Research ==
Schüpbach's research focuses on signaling pathways that are involved in pattern formation during embryonic development. Using the fruit fly (Drosophila melanogaster) as a model system, she revealed molecular mechanisms underlying the determination of the major axis of the embryo. Performing genetic screens, she identified mutants that result in female sterility of which many affect embryonic body patterning. By that, she contributed to the understanding of maternal factors that are deposited into the forming egg during oogenesis and that are conferred into spatial information within the developing embryo to demarcate distinct functional regions. Schüpbach continues to do research focusing on reproductive medicine; she has done much of this work with her good friend Ruth Lehmann.

== Life ==
Schüpbach received her Ph.D. in Biology from the University of Zurich, Switzerland, where she also performed her first postdoctoral work before she continued as a postdoc at Princeton University. In 1990 she was appointed as Associate Professor and promoted to Full Professor in 1994 at Princeton University. Schüpbach is married to Nobel laureate and fellow biologist Eric F. Wieschaus.

== Honors ==
- 1981 Alfred Schlafli Prize for thesis research awarded by Swiss Zoological Society
- 1999 Elected Fellow, American Academy of Arts and Sciences
- 2000 Elected Associate Member European Molecular Biology Organization
- 2005 Elected to the National Academy of Sciences
- 2006 Edwin F. Conklin Medal, Society for Developmental Biology
- 2007 Elected Fellow, American Association for the Advancement of Science
- 2011 Honorary Degree, University of Zurich, Switzerland
- 2020 Francis Amory Prize, American Academy of Arts and Sciences

== Trivia ==
Genetic screenings for maternal effect "grandchildless" mutants resulted in the identification of a set of genes that are essential for the patterning of the egg and developing embryo. Many of the affected genes were named by Trudi Schüpbach after royal dynasties that extinguished due to the lack of offspring such as staufen, vasa, valois and tudor.
