= STAU1 =

Protein-coding gene in the species Homo sapiens

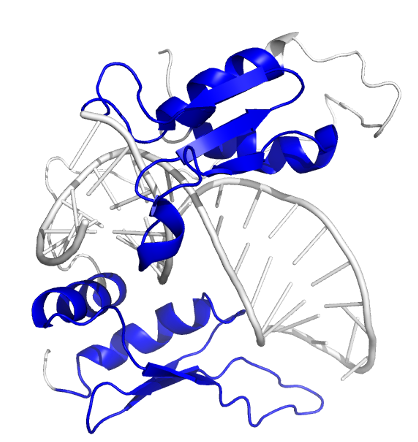

Identifiers
- Aliases: STAU1, PPP1R150, STAU, staufen double-stranded RNA binding protein 1
- External IDs: OMIM: 601716; MGI: 1338864; GeneCards: STAU1
Available structures
| PDB | Ortholog search: PDBe RCSB |
| PDB | List of PDB id codes 4DKK |

Gene location (Human)
| Chr. | Chromosome 20 (human) |
| Band | 20q13.13 | Start | 49,113,339 bp |
| Band | 20q13.13 | End | 49,188,367 bp |

Gene location (Mouse)
| Chr. | Chromosome 2 (mouse) |
| Band | 2|2 H3 | Start | 166,789,469 bp |
| Band | 2|2 H3 | End | 166,838,219 bp |
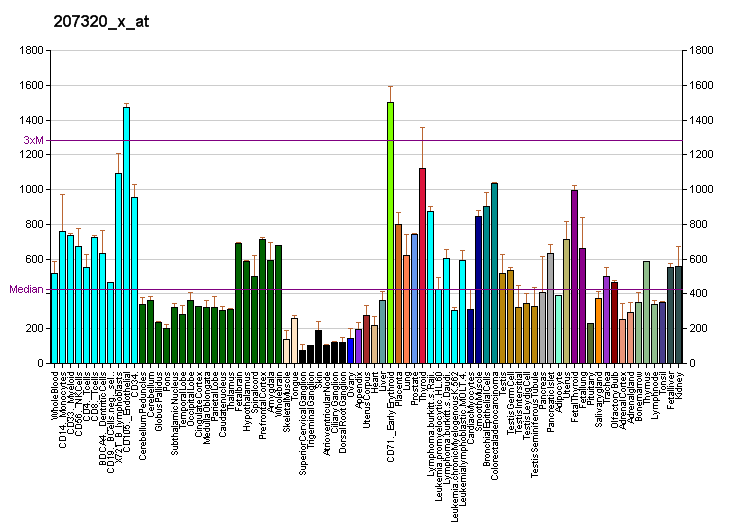

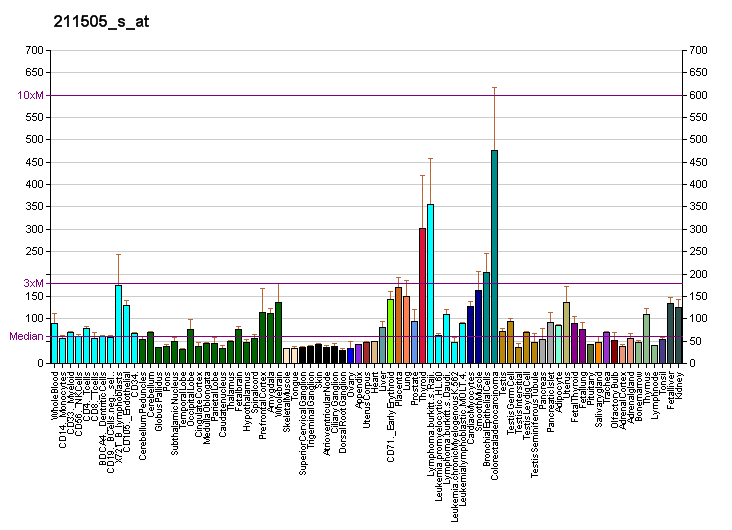

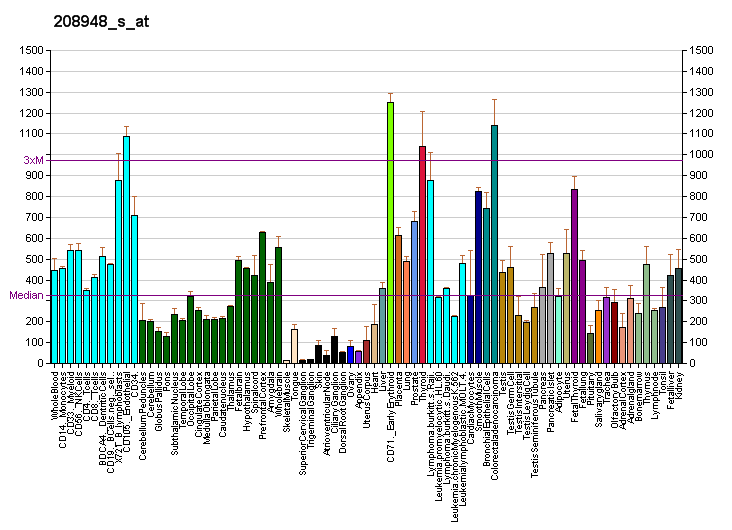
RNA expression pattern
| Bgee | Human / Mouse (ortholog); Top expressed in: kidney tubule; secondary oocyte; amniotic fluid; parietal pleura; pancreatic ductal cell; visceral pleura; endothelial cell; germinal epithelium; palpebral conjunctiva; glomerulus / Top expressed in: tail of embryo; genital tubercle; cumulus cell; molar; primary oocyte; secondary oocyte; ventricular zone; zygote; neural tube; maxillary prominence; More reference expression data |
| BioGPS | More reference expression data |
Gene ontology
| Molecular function | protein phosphatase 1 binding; protein binding; double-stranded RNA binding; RNA binding |
| Cellular component | cytoplasm; cell body; rough endoplasmic reticulum; membrane; plasma membrane; microtubule associated complex; soma; dendrite; endoplasmic reticulum; cytoplasmic ribonucleoprotein granule; neuron projection; cytoplasmic stress granule; extracellular exosome; cytosol; glutamatergic synapse |
| Biological process | positive regulation of long-term synaptic potentiation; positive regulation by virus of viral protein levels in host cell; cellular response to oxidative stress; positive regulation of viral genome replication; modulation of chemical synaptic transmission; modification of postsynaptic structure; viral process |
Sources:Amigo / QuickGO
Orthologs
| Databases | NCBI: entry; OMA: entry |
| Species | Human | Mouse |
| Entrez | 6780 | 20853 |
| Ensembl | ENSG00000124214 | ENSMUSG00000039536 |
| UniProt | O95793 | Q9Z108 |
| RefSeq (mRNA) | NM_001037328; NM_004602; NM_017452; NM_017453; NM_017454 NM_001319134; NM_001319135; NM_001322927; NM_001322928; NM_001322929; NM_001322930; NM_001322931; NM_001322932; NM_001322933 | NM_001109905; NM_001109906; NM_001291160; NM_011490 |
| RefSeq (protein) | NP_001032405; NP_001306063; NP_001306064; NP_001309856; NP_001309857 NP_001309858; NP_001309859; NP_001309860; NP_001309861; NP_001309862; NP_004593; NP_059346; NP_059347; NP_059348 | NP_001103375; NP_001103376; NP_001278089; NP_035620 |
| Location (UCSC) | Chr 20: 49.11 – 49.19 Mb | Chr 2: 166.79 – 166.84 Mb |
| PubMed search |
- Wikidata
| View/Edit Human | View/Edit Mouse |

Double-stranded RNA-binding protein Staufen homolog 1 also known as Staufen1 is a protein that in humans is encoded by the STAU1 gene.

Staufen is a member of the family of double-stranded RNA (dsRNA)-binding proteins involved in the transport and/or localization of mRNAs to different subcellular compartments and/or organelles. These proteins are characterized by the presence of multiple dsRNA-binding domains which are required to bind RNAs having double-stranded secondary structures. The human homologue of staufen encoded by STAU, in addition contains a microtubule-binding domain similar to that of microtubule-associated protein 1B, and binds tubulin. Five transcript variants resulting from alternative splicing of STAU gene and encoding three isoforms have been described. Three of these variants encode the same isoform, however, differ in their 5'UTR.

STAU1 is associated with stress granules.

== Gene ==
Mature STAU1 mRNAs produce five alternative splice variants that are different in their 5’UTR regions.

== Tissue distribution ==
STAU1 is expressed in many cell types and tissues and STAU2 is expressed in the brain and heart.

== Structure ==
Staufen1 is a modular double-stranded RNA-binding protein that contains four dsRNA-binding domains (dsRBD2–dsRBD5, PF00035) separated by flexible linkers. Staufen1 also contains a microtubule/tubulin-binding domain between dsRBD4 and dsRBD5 and a short Staufen-swapping motif (SSM) immediately N-terminal to dsRBD5.

The RNA-binding core of Staufen1 is the tandem dsRBD3–dsRBD4 region. Each of these domains belongs to the dsRBD fold family that contain two α-helices packed against a three-stranded antiparallel β-sheet (α–β–β–β–α). The tandem domains bind A-form RNA through contacts with the sugar–phosphate backbone and RNA grooves.

The free staufen1 structure is not globular, but it is rather elongated and flexible.

STAU1-binding sites (SBS) are located in 3’UTR, 5’UTR, and coding regions of over 1000 transcripts.

== Function ==
STAU1 is a double-stranded RNA-binding protein that regulates post-transcriptional RNA metabolism. By binding to structured regions o RNAs and assembling into ribonucleoprotein complexes, Staufen1 contributes to mRNA transport, translational regulation, and transcript turnover. Binding of Staufen1 to a structured Staufen-binding site, often in an mRNA 3′ untranslated region can recruit the RNA helicase UPF1 and initiate Staufen-mediated mRNA decay, thereby reducing the abundance of targeted transcripts. Staufen1 can also influence nuclear RNA export and alternative pre-mRNA splicing.

== Regulation ==
=== RNA metabolism ===
STAU1 has a role in RNA metabolism. Motor proteins dynein and kinesin are recruited and actively transport mRNAs to subcellular locations using cytoskeletal networks.

Staufen-mediated mRNA decay (SMD) is an mRNA degradation process that involves direct binding of STAU1 to SBS, which is located downstream of the stop codon of the target mRNA. The STAU1 binding site (SBS) within the human ADP-ribosylation factor1 3'UTR binds STAU1 and downregulates ARF1 cytoplasmic mRNA levels by SMD. The molecolar complex made of mRNA and two dimerized Staufen protein particles is called dimerized Staufen complex, a complex involved in SMD. SSM deletion does not inhibit Staufen1 RNA binding, but it induces the formation of a non-dimerized Staufen complex that inhibits SMD.

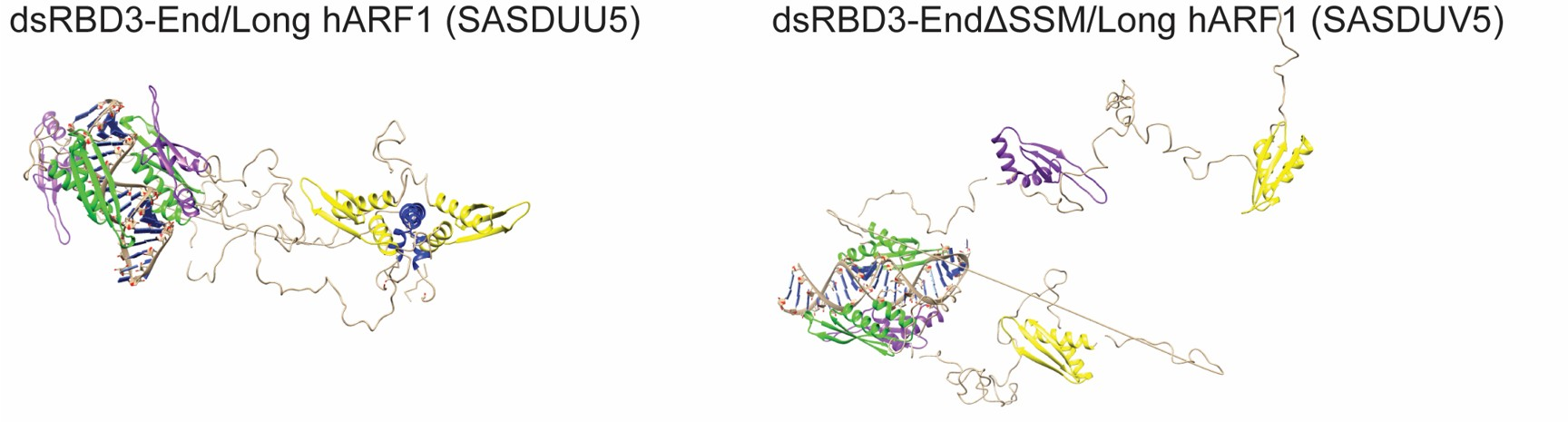
Dimerized and non-dimerized Staufen-mediated mRNA decay

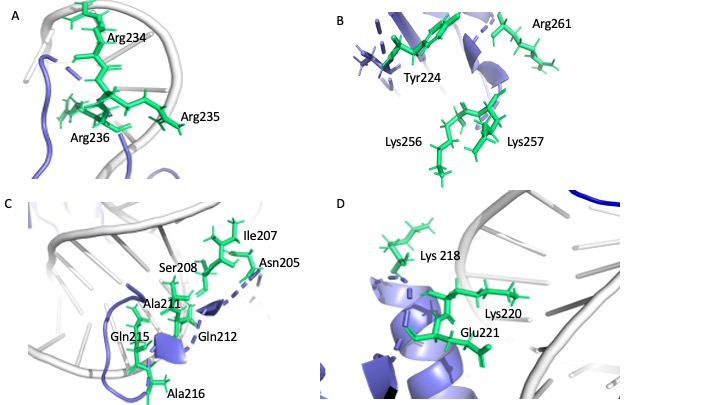
STAU1 interactions

=== Cell growth ===
In vitro, STAU1 may regulate mRNA translation of the cell cycle. Expression of STAU1 may be involved in mitosis.

== Clinical significance ==
STAU1 regulates multiple aspects of post-transcriptional RNA metabolism. As such, its dysregulated expression or activity has been implicated in several diseases. Altered STAU1 expression has been associated with neuromuscular and neurodegenerative disorders (including myotonic dystrophy type 1, amyotrophic lateral sclerosis, spinocerebellar ataxia type 2, and Huntington’s disease) as well as with worse prognosis in several cancer types (such as prostate cancer, high-grade glioma, lung cancer, and rhabdomyosarcoma). Consequently, STAU1 has been proposed as a potential biomarker and therapeutic target. However, these applications remain investigational and require clinical validation.

== Research ==
=== Cell polarity ===
Various cell polarity proteins are classified as tumor suppressors or proto-oncogenes as a disruption of cell polarity has been linked to cancer. STAU1 has been shown to be asymmetrically distributed in the apical pole in differentiated intestinal epithelial cells, which reveals a possible role for STAU1-induced cell polarity in normal tissue development. In vitro, STAU1 may exhibit tumor suppressor or oncogenic effects depending on the source and type of cancer stem cells. For example, the expression of STAU1 in vitro has shown a negative impact on the differentiation of mouse myoblasts.

=== Stau1-mediated mRNA decay ===
Staufen-mediated mRNA decay (SMD) is being investigated for its potential role in cancer cell proliferation. SMD of transcriptional factor retina and anterior neural fold homobox2 transcript may be required for the inhibition of tumor growth and metastasis.

=== Cellular differentiation ===
In differentiated human neuroblastoma cell lines, localization of ribonucleoprotein complexes containing STAU1 in some dendrites is necessary for dendrite formation and morphology. Regulating STAU1-mediated alternative splicing is being studied for how it may affect neural growth, proliferation, and axon development.
