= MicroRNA 4521 =

Non-coding RNA in the species Homo sapiens

MIR4521

Identifiers
- Aliases: MIR4521, mir-4521, microRNA 4521
- External IDs: GeneCards: MIR4521; OMA:MIR4521 - orthologs

Gene location (Human)
Chr.	Chromosome 17 (human)
Band	17p13.1	Start	8,186,945 bp
Band	17p13.1	End	8,187,004 bp
RNA expression pattern
Bgee	Human / Mouse (ortholog); Top expressed in: blood; sural nerve; bone marrow; Descending thoracic aorta; monocyte; muscle of leg; gastrocnemius muscle; endometrium; Achilles tendon; lymph node / n/a; More reference expression data
BioGPS	n/a
Orthologs
Species	Human	Mouse
Entrez	100616406	n/a
Ensembl	ENSG00000283160	n/a
UniProt	n a	n/a
RefSeq (mRNA)	n/a	n/a
RefSeq (protein)	n/a	n/a
Location (UCSC)	Chr 17: 8.19 – 8.19 Mb	n/a
PubMed search		n/a
- Wikidata
View/Edit Human

MicroRNA 4521 is a micro RNA that in humans is encoded by the MIR4521 gene.

== Function ==
microRNAs (miRNAs) are short (20-24 nt) non-coding RNAs that are involved in post-transcriptional regulation of gene expression in multicellular organisms by affecting both the stability and translation of mRNAs. miRNAs are transcribed by RNA polymerase II as part of capped and polyadenylated primary transcripts (pri-miRNAs) that can be either protein-coding or non-coding.

The primary transcript is cleaved by the Drosha ribonuclease III enzyme to produce an approximately 70-nt stem-loop precursor miRNA (pre-miRNA), which is further cleaved by the cytoplasmic Dicer ribonuclease to generate the mature miRNA and antisense miRNA star (miRNA*) products. The mature miRNA is incorporated into a RNA-induced silencing complex (RISC), which recognizes target mRNAs through imperfect base pairing with the miRNA and most commonly results in translational inhibition or destabilization of the target mRNA. The RefSeq represents the predicted microRNA stem-loop.

miR-4521 has been shown to have decreased expression in various cancers, including breast cancer and lung cancer. In gastric carcinoma, miR-4521 has been reported to inhibit EMT and metastasis.
