= PIN domain =

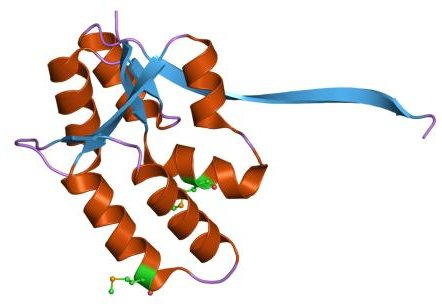
- Crystal structure of PIN (PilT N-terminus) domain (AF0591) from Archaeoglobus fulgidus at 1.90 Angstrom resolution. 1o4w

Identifiers
- Symbol: PIN
- Pfam: PF01850
- InterPro: IPR002716
- SMART: CBS
- SCOP2: 3dbo / SCOPe / SUPFAM
- CDD: cd09852
Available protein structures:
- Pfam: structures / ECOD
- PDB: RCSB PDB; PDBe; PDBj
- PDBsum: structure summary
- PDB: 3dbo, 1v8o, 1o4w

In molecular biology the PIN domain is a protein domain that is about 130 amino acids in length. PIN domains function as nuclease enzymes that cleave single stranded RNA in a sequence- or structure-dependent manner.

PIN domains contain four nearly invariant acidic residues. Crystal structures show these residues clustered together in the putative active site. In eukaryotes PIN domains are found in proteins involved in nonsense mediated mRNA decay, in proteins such as SMG5 and SMG6, and in processing of 18S ribosomal RNA. The majority of PIN-domain proteins found in prokaryotes are the toxic components of toxin-antitoxin operons. These loci provide a control mechanism that helps free-living prokaryotes cope with nutritional stress.
