= UPF3A =

Protein-coding gene in the species Homo sapiens

Available structures
PDB	Ortholog search: PDBe RCSB
PDB	List of PDB id codes 2L08

Identifiers
- Aliases: UPF3A, HRENT3A, UPF3, UPF3 regulator of nonsense transcripts homolog A (yeast), regulator of nonsense mediated mRNA decay
- External IDs: OMIM: 605530; MGI: 1914281; HomoloGene: 23395; GeneCards: UPF3A; OMA:UPF3A - orthologs

Gene location (Mouse)
Chr.	Chromosome 8 (mouse)
Band	8|8 A1.1	Start	13,835,615 bp
Band	8|8 A1.1	End	13,849,193 bp
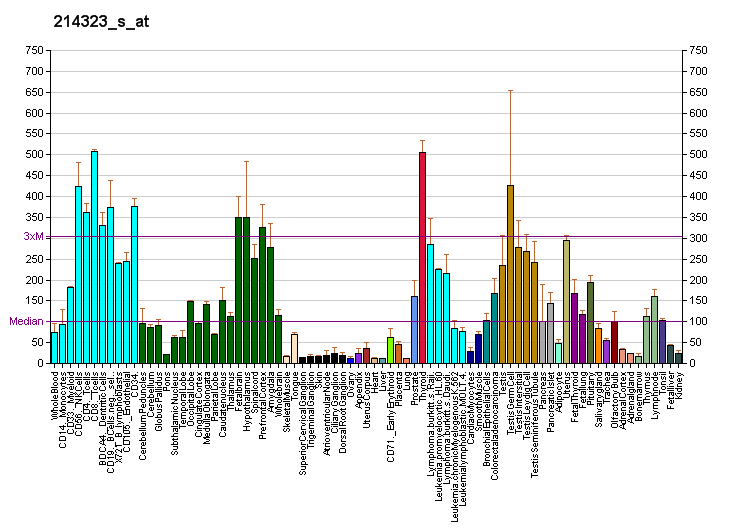

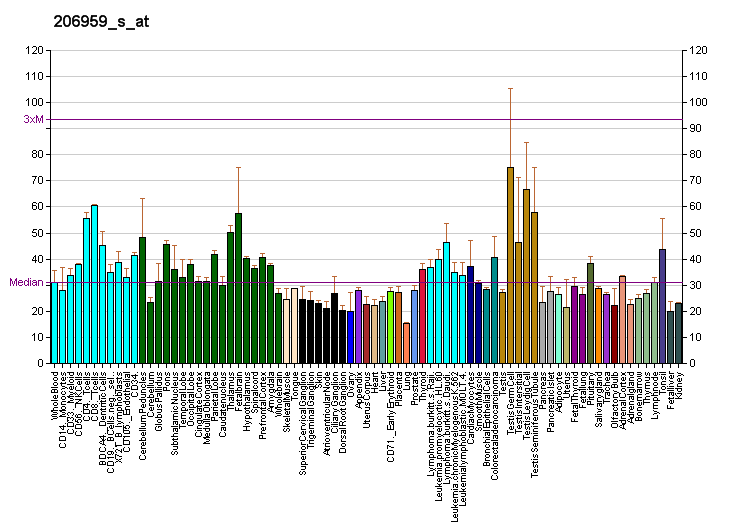

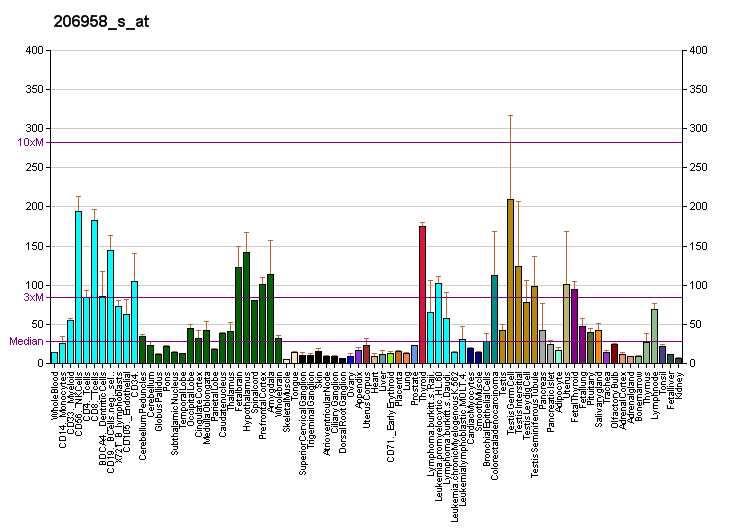
RNA expression pattern
Bgee	Human / Mouse (ortholog); n/a / Top expressed in: seminiferous tubule; otolith organ; utricle; Paneth cell; fossa; trigeminal ganglion; condyle; medullary collecting duct; renal corpuscle; hair follicle
BioGPS	More reference expression data
Gene ontology
Molecular function	protein binding; telomeric DNA binding; RNA binding; nucleic acid binding; structural constituent of nuclear pore
Cellular component	exon-exon junction complex; intracellular membrane-bounded organelle; nucleus; cytoplasm; cytosol; nucleolus
Biological process	mRNA transport; nuclear-transcribed mRNA catabolic process, nonsense-mediated decay; positive regulation of translation; nucleocytoplasmic transport
Sources:Amigo / QuickGO
Orthologs
Species	Human	Mouse
Entrez	65110	67031
Ensembl	ENSG00000169062	ENSMUSG00000038398
UniProt	Q9H1J1	Q3ULJ3
RefSeq (mRNA)	NM_023011; NM_080687	NM_025924
RefSeq (protein)	NP_075387; NP_542418; NP_001340573; NP_001340574; NP_001340575 NP_001340576; NP_001340577; NP_001340578; NP_001340579; NP_001340580; NP_001340581	NP_080200
Location (UCSC)	n/a	Chr 8: 13.84 – 13.85 Mb
PubMed search
- Wikidata
View/Edit Human	View/Edit Mouse

Regulator of nonsense transcripts 3A is a protein that in humans is encoded by the UPF3A gene.

This gene encodes a protein that is part of a post-splicing multiprotein complex involved in both mRNA nuclear export and mRNA surveillance. The encoded protein is one of two functional homologs to yeast Upf3p. mRNA surveillance detects exported mRNAs with truncated open reading frames and initiates nonsense-mediated mRNA decay (NMD). When translation ends upstream from the last exon-exon junction, this triggers NMD to degrade mRNAs containing premature stop codons. This protein binds to the mRNA and remains bound after nuclear export, acting as a nucleocytoplasmic shuttling protein. It complexes with RBM8A to bind specifically 20 nt upstream of exon-exon junctions. This gene is located on the long arm of chromosome 13. Two splice variants encoding different isoforms exist.

== Interactions ==
UPF3A interacts with RBM8A, UPF2 and UPF1.
