= MRNA surveillance =

Intracellular mechanisms

mRNA surveillance mechanisms are pathways utilized by organisms to ensure fidelity and quality of messenger RNA (mRNA) molecules. There are a number of surveillance mechanisms present within cells. These mechanisms function at various steps of the mRNA biogenesis pathway to detect and degrade transcripts that have not properly been processed.

== Overview ==
The translation of messenger RNA transcripts into proteins is a vital part of the central dogma of molecular biology. mRNA molecules are, however, prone to a host of fidelity errors which can cause errors in translation of mRNA into quality proteins. RNA surveillance mechanisms are methods cells use to assure the quality and fidelity of the mRNA molecules. This is generally achieved through marking aberrant mRNA molecule for degradation by various endogenous nucleases.

mRNA surveillance has been documented in bacteria and yeast. In eukaryotes, these mechanisms are known to function in both the nucleus and cytoplasm. Fidelity checks of mRNA molecules in the nucleus results in the degradation of improperly processed transcripts before export into the cytoplasm. Transcripts are subject to further surveillance once in the cytoplasm. Cytoplasmic surveillance mechanisms assess mRNA transcripts for the absence of or presence of premature stop codons.

Three surveillance mechanisms are currently known to function within cells: the nonsense-mediated mRNA decay pathway (NMD); the nonstop mediated mRNA decay pathways (NSD); and the no-go mediated mRNA decay pathway (NGD).

== Nonsense-mediated mRNA decay ==
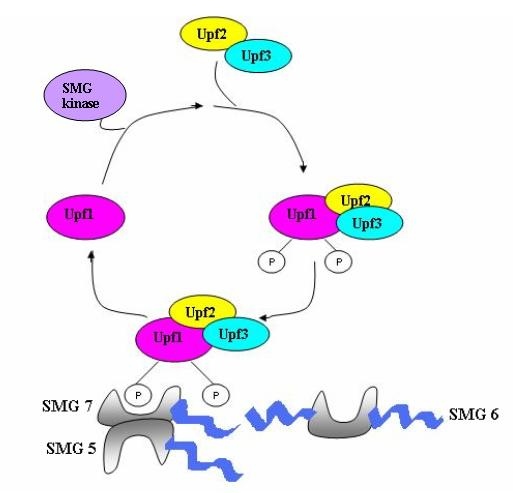
UPF1 is a conserved helicase which is phosphorylated in the process of NMD. This phosphorylation is catalyzed by SMG1 kinase. This process requires UPF2 and UPF3. Dephosphorylation of UPF1 is catalyzed by SMG5, SMG6 and SMG7 proteins.

=== Overview ===
Nonsense-mediated decay is involved in detection and decay of mRNA transcripts which contain premature termination codons (PTCs). PTCs can arise in cells through various mechanisms: germline mutations in DNA; somatic mutations in DNA; errors in transcription; or errors in post transcriptional mRNA processing. Failure to recognize and decay these mRNA transcripts can result in the production of truncated proteins which may be harmful to the organism. By causing decay of C-terminally truncated polypeptides, the NMD mechanism can protect cells against deleterious dominant-negative, and gain of function effects. PTCs have been implicated in approximately 30% of all inherited diseases; as such, the NMD pathway plays a vital role in assuring overall survival and fitness of an organism.

A surveillance complex consisting of various proteins (eRF1, eRF3, Upf1, Upf2 and Upf3) is assembled and scans the mRNA for premature stop codons. The assembly of this complex is triggered by premature translation termination. If a premature stop codon is detected then the mRNA transcript is signalled for degradation – the coupling of detection with degradation occurs.

Seven smg genes (smg1-7) and three UPF genes (Upf1-3) have been identified in Saccharomyces cerevisiae and Caenorhabditis elegans as essential trans-acting factors contributing to NMD activity. All of these genes are conserved in Drosophila melanogaster and further mammals where they also play critical roles in NMD. Throughout eukaryotes there are three components which are conserved in the process of NMD. These are the Upf1/SMG-2, Upf2/SMG-3 and Upf3/SMG-4 complexes. Upf1/SMG-2 is a phosphoprotein in multicellular organisms and is thought to contribute to NMD via its phosphorylation activity. However, the exact interactions of the proteins and their roles in NMD are currently disputed.

=== Mechanism in mammals ===
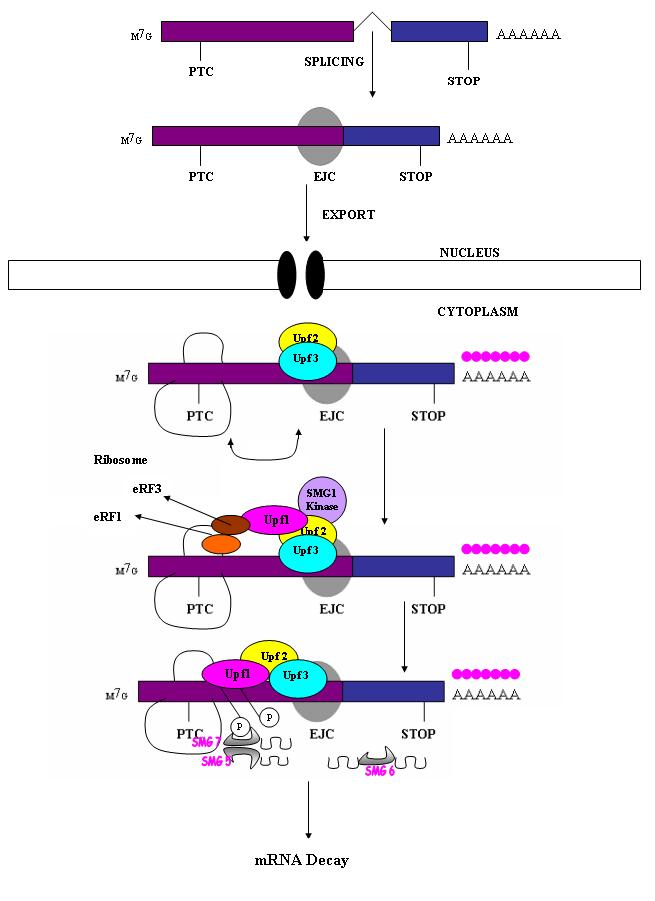
Nonsense mediated decay in mammals is mediated by the exon-exon junction. This junction is marked by a group of proteins which constitute the exon junction complex (EJC). The EJC recruits UPF1/SMG by transcription factors eRF1/eRF3. Interactions of these proteins lead to the assembly of the surveillance complex. This complex is ultimately responsible for the degradation of the nonsense mRNA.

A premature stop codon must be recognized as different from a normal stop codon so that only the former triggers a NMD response. It has been observed that the ability of a nonsense codon to cause mRNA degradation depends on its relative location to the downstream sequence element and associated proteins. Studies have demonstrated that nucleotides more than 50–54 nucleotides upstream of the last exon-exon junction can target mRNA for decay. Those downstream from this region are unable to do so. Thus, nonsense codons lie more than 50-54 nucleotides upstream from the last exon boundary whereas natural stop codons are located within terminal exons. Exon junction complexes (EJCs) mark the exon-exon boundaries. EJCs are multiprotein complexes that assemble during splicing at a position about 20–24 nucleotides upstream from the splice junction. It is this EJC that provides position information needed to discriminate premature stop codons from natural stop codons. Recognition of PTCs appears to be dependent on the definitions of the exon-exon junctions. This suggests involvement of the spliceosome in mammalian NMD. Research has investigated the possibility of spliceosome involvement in mammalian NMD and has determined this is a likely possibility. Furthermore, it has been observed that NMD mechanisms are not activated by nonsense transcripts that are generated from genes that naturally do not contain introns (e.g., Histone H4, Hsp70, melanocortin-4-receptor).

When the ribosome reaches a PTC the translation factors eRF1 and eRF3 interact with retained EJC complexes though a multiprotein bridge. The interactions of UPF1 with the terminating complex and with UPF2/UPF3 of the retained EJCs are critical. It is these interactions which target the mRNA for rapid decay by endogenous nucleases

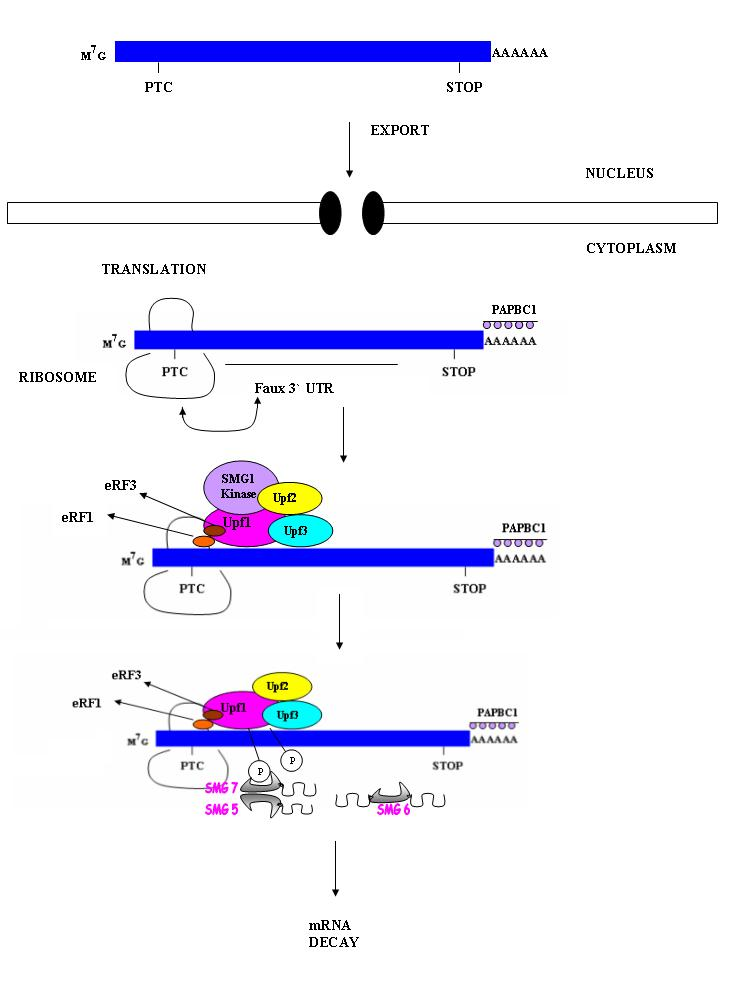
Nonsense mediated mRNA decay in invertebrates is postulated to be mediated by the presence of a faux 3' untranslated region (UTR). These faux 3'UTRs are distinguished from natural 3'UTRs which follow natural stop codons. This is due to the lack of binding proteins which are normally present in natural 3'UTR. These binding proteins include the poly(A)-binding protein (PABP).

=== Mechanism in invertebrates ===
Studies involving organisms such as S. cerevisiae, D.melanogaster and C. elegans have shown that PTC recognition involving invertebrate organisms does not involve exon-exon boundaries. These studies suggest that invertebrate NMD occurs independently of splicing. As a result, EJCs which are responsible for marking exon-exon boundaries are not required in invertebrate NMD. Several models have been proposed to explain how PTCs are distinguished from normal stop codons in invertebrates. One of these suggests that there may be a downstream sequence element which functions similar to the exon junctions in mammals. A second model proposes that a widely present feature in mRNA, such as a 3' poly-A tail, might provide the positional information required for recognition. Another model, dubbed the "faux 3'UTR model", suggests that premature translation termination may be distinguished from normal termination because of intrinsic features that may allow it to recognize its presence in an inappropriate environment. These mechanisms, however, have yet to be conclusively demonstrated.

=== Mechanism in plants ===
There are two mechanisms of PTC recognition in plants: according to its distance from the EJC (like in vertebrates) or from the poly-A tail. The NMD mechanism in plants induces the decay of mRNAs containing a 3’UTR longer than 300 nucleotides, that is why the proportion of mRNAs with longer 3'UTRs is much lower in plants than in vertebrates.

=== NMD avoidance ===
mRNAs with nonsense mutations are generally thought to be targeted for decay via the NMD pathways. The presence of this premature stop codon about 50-54 nucleotides 5' to the exon junction appears to be the trigger for rapid decay; however, it has been observed that some mRNA molecules with a premature stop codon are able to avoid detection and decay. In general, these mRNA molecules possess the stop codon very early in the reading frame (i.e. the PTC is AUG-proximal). This appears to be a contradiction to the current accepted model of NMD as this position is significantly 5' of the exon-exon junction.

This has been demonstrated in β-globulin. β-globulin mRNAs containing a nonsense mutation early in the first exon of the gene are more stable than NMD sensitive mRNA molecules. The exact mechanism of detection avoidance is currently not known. It has been suggested that the poly-A binding protein (PABP) appears to play a role in this stability. It has been demonstrated in other studies that the presence of this protein near AUG-proximal PTCs appears to promote the stability of these otherwise NMD sensitive mRNAs. It has been observed that this protective effect is not limited only to the β-globulin promoter. This suggests that this NMD avoidance mechanism may be prevalent in other tissue types for a variety of genes. The current model of NMD may need to be revisited upon further studies.

== Nonstop mediated mRNA decay ==
=== Overview ===
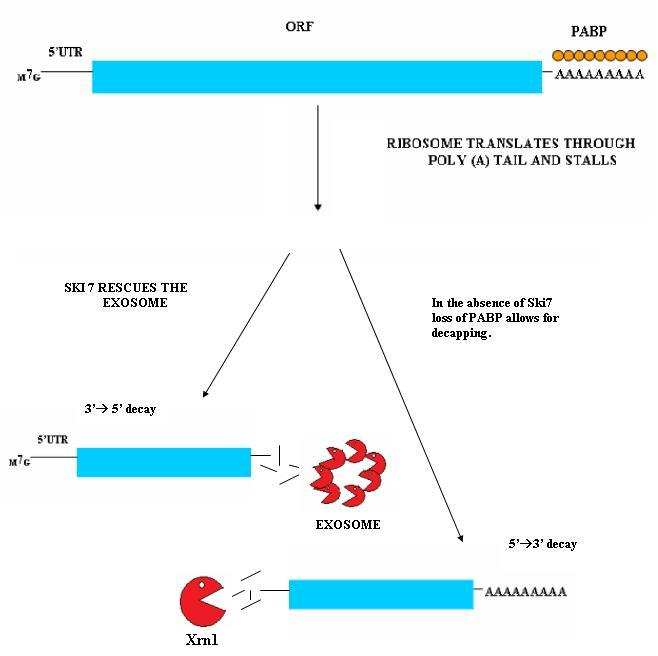
Nonstop mediated mRNA. Translation of a mRNA without a stop codon results in the translation of the ribosome into the 3' poly-A tail region. this results in a stalled ribosome. The ribosome is rescued by two distinct pathways. The mechanisms are dependent of the absence or presence of the Ski7 protein.

Nonstop mediated decay (NSD) is involved in the detection and decay of mRNA transcripts which lack a stop codon. These mRNA transcripts can arise from many different mechanisms such as premature 3' adenylation or cryptic polyadenylation signals within the coding region of a gene. This lack of a stop codon results a significant issue for cells. Ribosomes translating the mRNA eventually translate into the 3'poly-A tail region of transcripts and stalls. As a result, it cannot eject the mRNA. Ribosomes thus may become sequestered associated with the nonstop mRNA and would not be available to translate other mRNA molecules into proteins. Nonstop mediated decay resolves this problem by both freeing the stalled ribosomes and marking the nonstop mRNA for degradation in the cell by nucleases. Nonstop mediated decay consists of two distinct pathways which likely act in concert to decay nonstop mRNA.

=== Ski7 pathway ===
This pathway is active when Ski7 protein is available in the cell. The Ski7 protein is thought to bind to the empty A site of the ribosome. This binding allows the ribosome to eject the stuck nonstop mRNA molecule – this even frees the ribosome and allows it to translate other transcripts. The Ski7 is now associated with the nonstop mRNA and it is this association which targets the nonstop mRNA for recognition by the cytosolic exosome. The Ski7-exosome complex rapidly deadenylates the mRNA molecule which allows the exosome to decay the transcript in a 3' to 5' fashion.

=== Non-Ski7 pathway ===
A second type of NSD has been observed in yeast. In this mechanism, the absence of Ski7 results in the loss of poly-A tail binding PABP proteins by the action of the translation ribosome. The removal of these PABP proteins then results in the loss of the protective 5'm7G cap. The loss of the cap results in rapid degradation of the transcript by an endogenous 5'-3' exonuclease such as XrnI.

== No-Go decay ==
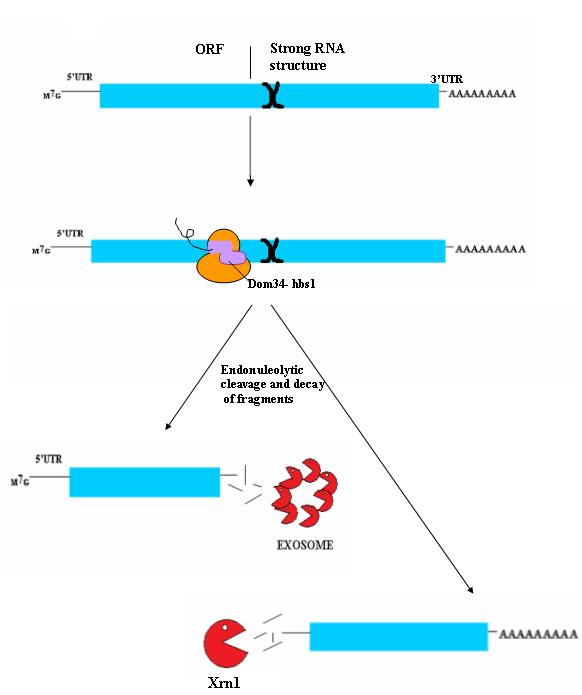
No-Go Mediated mRNA decay.

No-Go decay (NGD) is the most recently discovered surveillance mechanism. As such, it is not currently well understood. While authentic targets of NGD are poorly understood, they appear to consist largely of mRNA transcripts on which ribosomes have stalled during translation. This stall can be caused by a variety of factors including strong secondary structures, which may physically block the translational machinery from moving down the transcript. Dom34/Hbs1 likely binds near the A site of stalled ribosomes and may facilitate recycling of complexes. In some cases, the transcript is also cleaved in an endonucleolytic fashion near the stall site; however the identity of the responsible endonuclease remains contentious. The fragmented mRNA molecules are then fully degraded by the exosome in a 3' to 5' fashion and by Xrn1 in a 5' to 3' fashion. It is not currently known how this process releases the mRNA from the ribosomes, however, Hbs1 is closely related to the Ski7 protein which plays a clear role in ribosome release in Ski7 mediated NSD. It is postulated that Hbs1 may play a similar role in NGD.

== Evolution ==
It is possible to determine the evolutionary history of these mechanisms by observing the conservation of key proteins implicated in each mechanism. For example: Dom34/Hbs1 are associated with NGD; Ski7 is associated with NSD; and the eRF proteins are associated with NMD. To this end, extensive BLAST searches have been performed to determine the prevalence of the proteins in various types of organisms. It has been determined that NGD Hbs1 and NMD eRF3 are found only in eukaryotes. However, the NGD Dom34 is universal in eukaryotes and archaea. This suggests that NGD appears to have been the first evolved mRNA surveillance mechanism. The NSD Ski7 protein appears to be restricted strictly to yeast species which suggest that NSD is the most recently evolved surveillance mechanism. This by default leaves NMD as the second evolved surveillance mechanism.

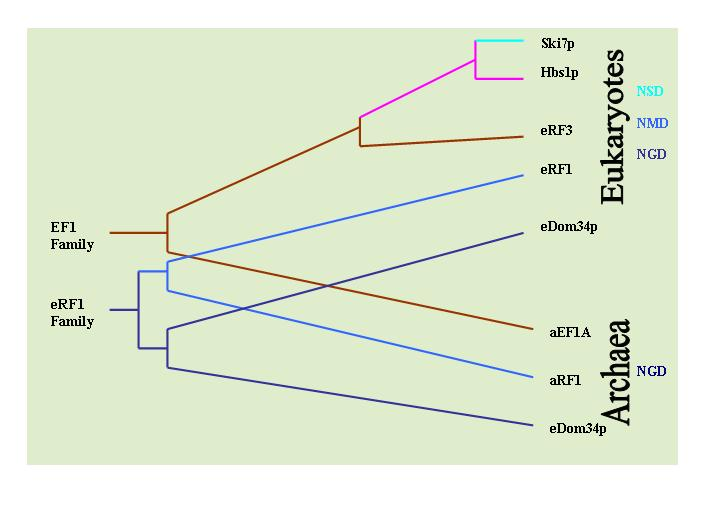
A proposed evolutionary mechanism for development of mRNA surveillance component proteins.
