= Vasa gene =

RNA binding protein

Vasa is an RNA-binding protein with an ATP-dependent RNA helicase that is a member of the DEAD box family of proteins. The vasa gene is essential for germ cell development and was first identified in Drosophila melanogaster, but has since been found to be conserved in a variety of vertebrates and invertebrates including humans. The Vasa protein is found primarily in germ cells in embryos and adults, where it is involved in germ cell determination and function, as well as in multipotent stem cells, where its exact function is unknown.

== Gene ==
The Vasa gene is a member of the DEAD box family of RNA helicases in Drosophila melanogaster. Its human ortholog, DDX4, is located on chromosome 5q11. It is syntenic to mouse chromosome 13, where the mouse vasa gene is located. The gene is conserved in many invertebrates and vertebrate species such as Caenorhabditis elegans, Xenopus, Zebrafish, flatworms, echinoderms, molluscs, nematodes, mice and rats as an important part of germ line maintenance and function.

All vertebrate species and Drosophila have only one vasa ortholog. However, C. elegans has four Vasa genes, of which only one (GLH-1) is essential.

All DEAD box genes, including Vasa, have 9 conserved sequence motifs. The Vasa gene family evolved from a duplication event followed by acquiring certain domains. Early in the evolution of multicellular animals, the duplication of PL10 related DEAD-box gene occurred. This resulted in animals having both Vasa and PL10 genes, but plants and fungi only have PL10 genes and no Vasa. After the duplication event, the N-terminal region acquired Zn-knuckle domains which are now conserved in invertebrates. Vertebrates and insects both have lost the Zn-knuckle domains. The number of these domains vary between different species Vasa genes. An important property of Zn-knuckles, which can be categorized as classical zinc fingers, is that they are able to bind to single and double stranded DNA or RNA. The presence of Zn-knuckles in invertebrates and absence in vertebrates may be an indication of differences in target binding sites. Their presence may be important to functions outside germ line development. An exception to this theory is the presence of Zn-knuckles in all four C. elegans Vasa genes, which are restricted to functions in the germ line.

== Protein ==
The protein product in humans has 724 amino acids, a molecular mass of 79 kDa and 8 conserved domains in all DEAD-box proteins that is involved in RNA helicase activity. Domain V contains the DEAD motif. As with other Vasa related proteins, human Vasa has a N terminus rich in glycine and RGG motif repeats that function in RNA binding.

Vasa is regulated at the transcript and protein level. Developing embryos and adults regulate Vasa expression to cell and tissue specific locations. In Drosophila, zygotic transcription of Vasa occurs at pole cells, and stays germ-line specific throughout the life of the organism.

The Vasa promoter is regulated through methylation. In cells were Vasa is transcribed successfully, the promoter is hypomethylated and in all other cells it is methylated. When Vasa is hypermethylated in testes, spermatogenesis defects may occur.

Post-transcriptionally Vasa has several splice forms in different animals. In Parhyale hawaiensis, Vasa transcript is uniformly distributed in the embryo and is localized depending on the stabilization of the 3'UTR (Untranslated Region) to the germ line cells. Translation can be inhibited by cis regulatory elements in the transcript's 5' and 3' UTRs. They may inhibit translation by forming secondary RNA structures or binding trans-acting factors. Vasa expression localization is directed by repressing these translation inhibitory pathways.

Post-translationally, in Drosophila, Vasa protein is localized to the pole plasm during embryonic development. Many other proteins in Drosophila are also localized to the poles. For example, oskar protein was found to localize to pole plasm and may be involved in anchoring Vasa to polar granules in the posterior pole of the oocyte. Another enzyme, fat facets, may further stabilize Vasa in the pole plasm. Other post-translational modification includes phosphorylation of the Vasa ortholog in C. elegans, and arginine methylation in a conserved region of mice, Xenopus and Drosophila Vasa genes.

== Function ==
One of main function of Vasa protein is in germ cell determination and function. It uses ATP-dependent RNA helicase catalytic activity to regulate the translation of multiple mRNAs. Vasa unwinds the duplex RNA by binding and bending short stretches of the duplex in a non-processive manner. The conserved domain may act as chaperones by unwinding RNA secondary structures and refolding properly. pre-mRNA splicing, ribosome biogenesis, nuclear export, translational regulation and degradation.

Vasa was found to bind RNA in a sequence-specific manner. In the Drosophila embryos, Vasa binds the Uracil-rich motif of the mei-P26 UTR. A mutation in Vasa reduced the interaction of between Mei-P26 and initiation factor elF58 which in turn significantly reduced translation of the gene.

Recent evidence in invertebrates suggests that Vasa has a role in multipotent stem cells, but the exact function is unknown.

=== Mutations ===
==== Drosophila ====
A null mutation causes female sterility due to severe defects in oogenesis but males are fertile.

Homozygous mutations for partial loss of function allows eggs to be fertilized but embryos lack germ cells.

==== Mus musculus ====
Mutations in Vasa homolog, Mvh, cause defects in spermatogenesis but females are fertile. Male sterility may be due to deficiencies in germ cell proliferation and differentiation (the mouse homolog of Droso.). Female fertility may be due to functional redundancy by other DEAD-box family members. Null mutation still allows primordial germ cells to form but have severe defects.

==== Homo sapiens ====
Although there are no studies done on Vasa mutations in humans, it is likely that it would cause sterility.

These sex-specific phenotypes in mice and Drosophila mutants suggest that Vasa either regulated differently or has different target functions in the two germ line types.

== Tissue, and subcellular distribution ==
Vasa expression is restricted to tissue specific cells. Until recently it was thought that Vasa protein can only be found in gametes and is undetectable in somatic cells. Within germ cells, Vasa is expressed in the cytoplasm. During embryogenesis, Vasa is expressed in migratory primordial germ cells (PGCs) at the gonadal ridge in both males and females. This specificity allows Vasa to be used as a highly specific marker for germ cells. In a patient with Sertoli cell syndrome, no Vasa signal was detected from testicular biopsy. However, recent studies show that Vasa functions in other cells as well.

A study on Macrostomum lignano found Vasa expression in multipotent neoblast stem cells in addition to germ cells. However, RNAi knockdown revealed that either Vasa is non-essential in this organism or is made functionally redundant by other Vasa-like genes. Similar results were found on studies of the colonial ascidian Botryllus primigenus, oysters, teleosts, clawed frog, the parasitic wasp, and the crustacean Parhyale hawaiensis.

Vasa expression has been observed in epithelial ovarian cancer cells. It was found to deter the DNA damage-induced G2 checkpoint by downregulating the expression of another gene. Vasa is also present in chicken embryonic stem cells where it induces expression of germ line genes. This function still supports the most important role of Vasa in germ line development. In Cnidarians, Vasa has a role in nerve cells and gland cells. Other examples include Vasa in multipotent stem cell cluster of Polyascus polygenea buds and stolon, Vasa in auxiliary cells of oyster ovaries, Vasa in non-germ-line lineages in the snail Ilyanassa, Vasa in progenitor mesodermal posterior growth zone of the polychaete annelid Platynereis dumerilii, and Vasa present in non-genetical segments during Oligochaete development. But no reports of vasa expressed outside of germ line cells in vertebrates or insects.

== Expression ==
In Drosophila, vasa expression is seen in germ cells, specifically the germline stem cells (GSC's) of female ovaries and in the early stages of spermatogenesis in the male testis.

=== Staining ===
Due to the localization of vasa, immunohistochemistry staining can be done with vasa antibodies. For example, vasa antibody staining is specific for germ cells in the D. melanogaster germarium.

This protein is localized to the cytoplasm of fetal germ cells and to the cytoplasm of developing oocytes in mammals.
