= STAU2 =

Protein-coding gene in the species Homo sapiens

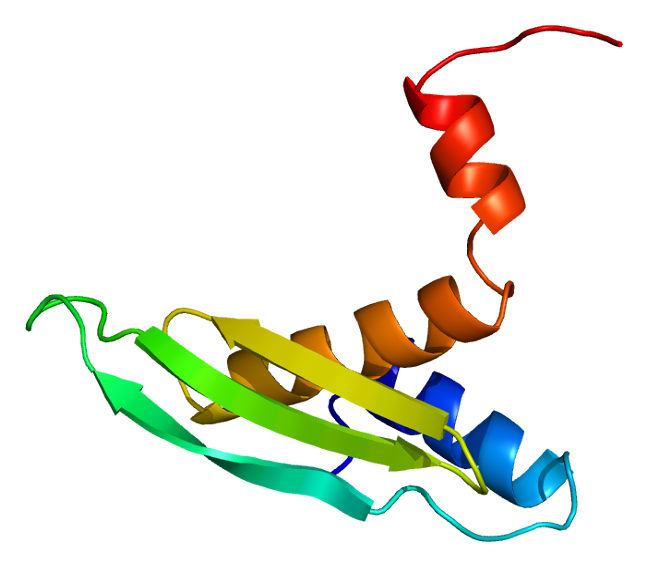

Identifiers
- Aliases: STAU2, 39K2, 39K3, staufen double-stranded RNA binding protein 2
- External IDs: OMIM: 605920; MGI: 1352508; GeneCards: STAU2

Gene location (Human)
Chr.	Chromosome 8 (human)
Band	8q21.11	Start	73,420,369 bp
Band	8q21.11	End	73,747,708 bp

Gene location (Mouse)
Chr.	Chromosome 1 (mouse)
Band	1|1 A3	Start	16,298,898 bp
Band	1|1 A3	End	16,590,336 bp
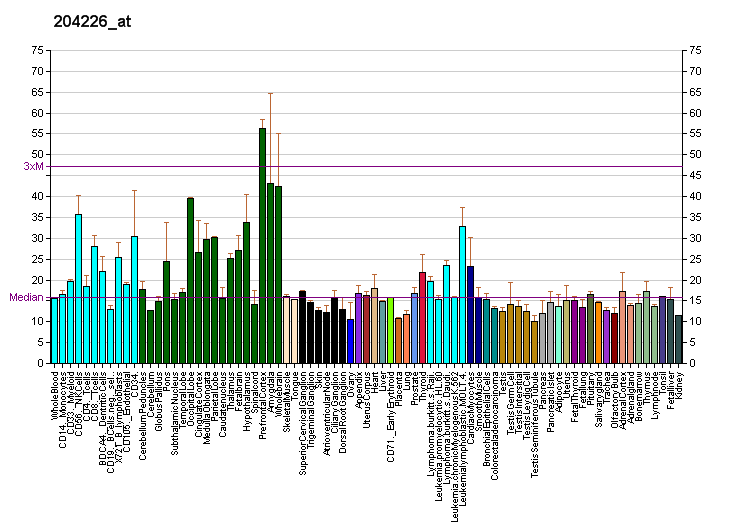
RNA expression pattern
Bgee	Human / Mouse (ortholog); Top expressed in: ganglionic eminence; prefrontal cortex; muscle of thigh; gastrocnemius muscle; Brodmann area 9; right frontal lobe; ventricular zone; cingulate gyrus; anterior cingulate cortex; epithelium of colon / Top expressed in: Rostral migratory stream; superior frontal gyrus; dentate gyrus of hippocampal formation granule cell; primary visual cortex; medial vestibular nucleus; piriform cortex; deep cerebellar nuclei; barrel cortex; Region I of hippocampus proper; facial motor nucleus; More reference expression data
BioGPS	More reference expression data
Gene ontology
Molecular function	double-stranded RNA binding; protein binding; RNA binding
Cellular component	cytoplasm; microtubule; nucleolus; endoplasmic reticulum; membrane; nucleus
Biological process	transport
Sources:Amigo / QuickGO
Orthologs
Databases	NCBI: entry; OMA: entry
Species	Human	Mouse
Entrez	27067	29819
Ensembl	ENSG00000040341	ENSMUSG00000025920
UniProt	Q9NUL3	Q8CJ67
RefSeq (mRNA)	NM_014393; NM_001164380; NM_001164381; NM_001164382; NM_001164383 NM_001164384; NM_001164385	NM_001111272; NM_025303; NM_001347044; NM_001347045
RefSeq (protein)	NP_001157852; NP_001157853; NP_001157854; NP_001157855; NP_001157856 NP_001157857; NP_055208	NP_001104742; NP_001333973; NP_001333974; NP_079579
Location (UCSC)	Chr 8: 73.42 – 73.75 Mb	Chr 1: 16.3 – 16.59 Mb
PubMed search
- Wikidata
View/Edit Human	View/Edit Mouse

Double-stranded RNA-binding protein Staufen homolog 2 is a protein that in humans is encoded by the STAU2 gene.

== Function ==
Staufen homolog 2 is a member of the family of double-stranded RNA (dsRNA)-binding proteins involved in the transport and/or localization of mRNAs to different subcellular compartments and/or organelles. These proteins are characterized by the presence of multiple dsRNA-binding domains which are required to bind RNAs having double-stranded secondary structures. Staufen homolog 2 shares 48.5% and 59.9% similarity with drosophila and human staufen, respectively. The exact function of Staufen homolog 2 is not known, but since it contains 3 copies of conserved dsRNA binding domain, it could be involved in double-stranded RNA binding events. Expression of Stau2 was sufficient to increase eye size, suggesting a novel biological role of Stau2 in eye morphogenesis.

== Clinical significance ==
Acting as a HIV-1 dependency factor, Staufen-2 promotes HIV-1 proliferation by positively regulating RNA export activity of viral protein Rev and recently it was reported that Staufen-2 is incorporated into HIV-1 particles and boost viral infectivity
