= SMG7 =

Protein-coding gene in humans

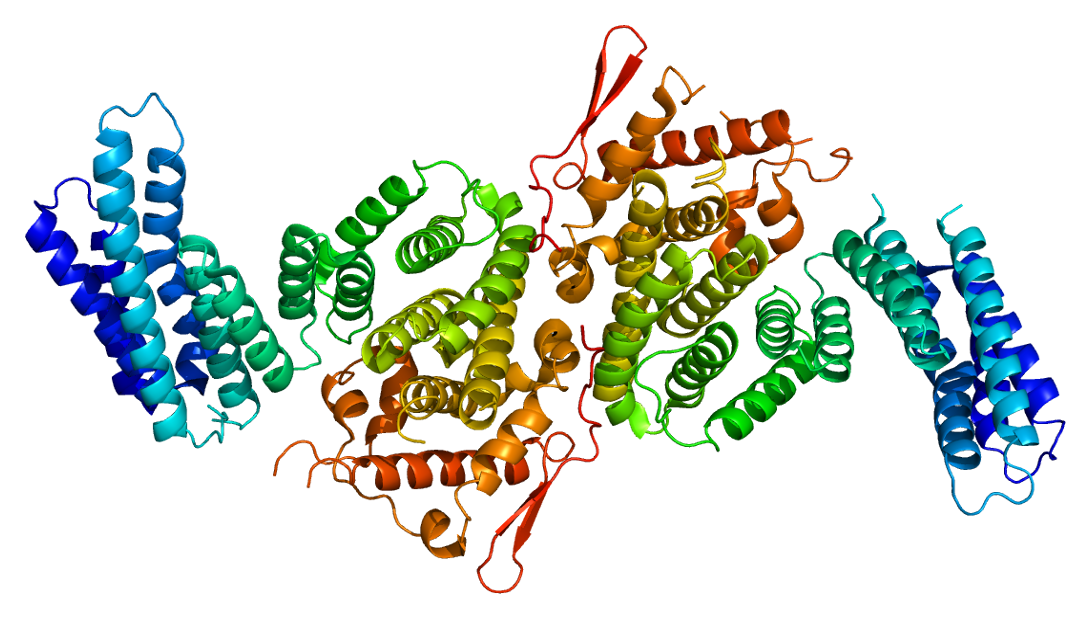

Identifiers
- Aliases: SMG7, C1orf16, EST1C, SGA56M, nonsense mediated mRNA decay factor, SMG7 nonsense mediated mRNA decay factor
- External IDs: OMIM: 610964; MGI: 2682334; GeneCards: SMG7
Available structures
PDB	Ortholog search: PDBe RCSB
PDB	List of PDB id codes 1YA0

Gene location (Human)
Chr.	Chromosome 1 (human)
Band	1q25.3	Start	183,472,216 bp
Band	1q25.3	End	183,598,246 bp

Gene location (Mouse)
Chr.	Chromosome 1 (mouse)
Band	1|1 G3	Start	152,712,746 bp
Band	1|1 G3	End	152,778,397 bp
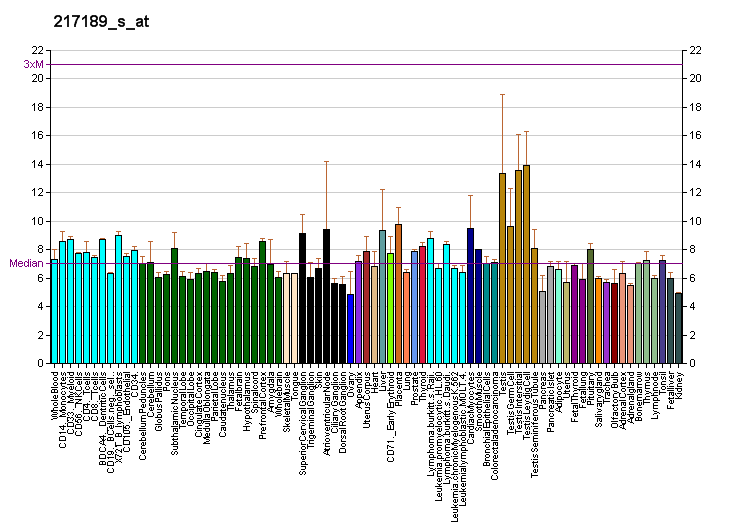

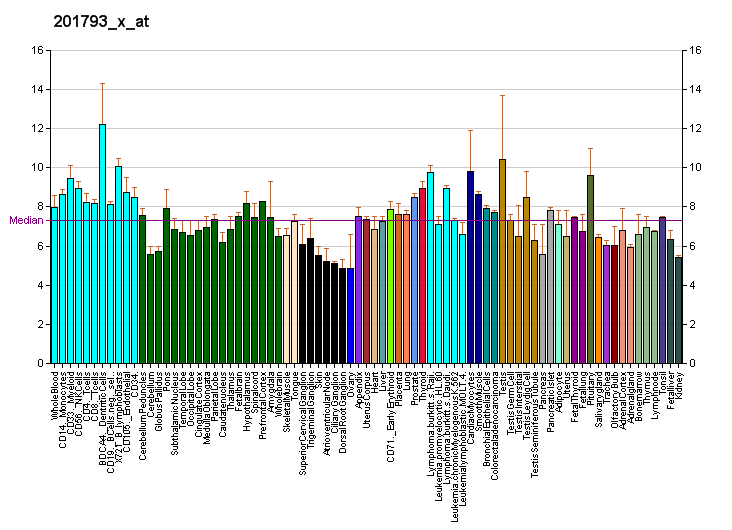

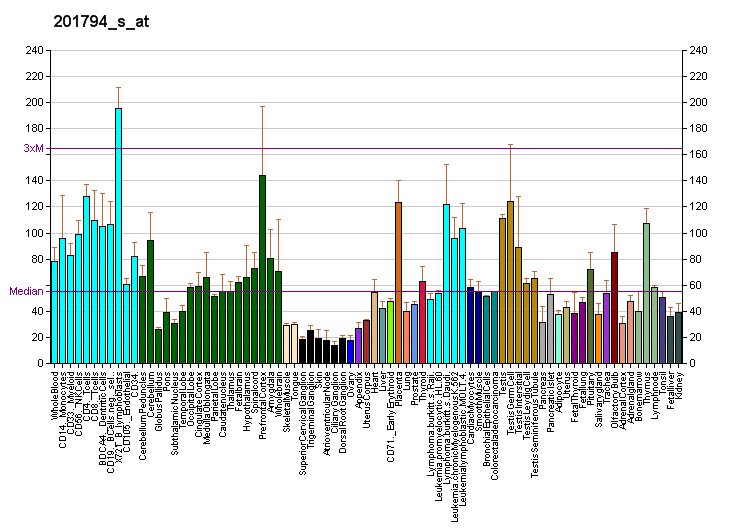
RNA expression pattern
Bgee	Human / Mouse (ortholog); Top expressed in: internal globus pallidus; tendon of biceps brachii; right uterine tube; right testis; left testis; islet of Langerhans; epithelium of colon; ganglionic eminence; postcentral gyrus; cerebellar cortex / Top expressed in: tail of embryo; genital tubercle; ascending aorta; aortic valve; zygote; blood; hand; cumulus cell; mesenteric lymph nodes; interventricular septum; More reference expression data
BioGPS	More reference expression data
Gene ontology
Molecular function	protein phosphatase 2A binding; protein binding; telomeric DNA binding; ribonuclease activity; ribonucleoprotein complex binding; telomerase RNA binding
Cellular component	cytoplasm; intermediate filament cytoskeleton; nucleus; telomerase holoenzyme complex; cytosol
Biological process	regulation of dephosphorylation; nuclear-transcribed mRNA catabolic process, nonsense-mediated decay; mRNA export from nucleus; telomere maintenance via telomerase; regulation of RNA stability; RNA phosphodiester bond hydrolysis; regulation of telomere maintenance via telomerase
Sources:Amigo / QuickGO
Orthologs
Databases	NCBI: entry; OMA: entry
Species	Human	Mouse
Entrez	9887	226517
Ensembl	ENSG00000116698	ENSMUSG00000042772
UniProt	Q92540	Q5RJH6
RefSeq (mRNA)	NM_001174061; NM_014837; NM_173156; NM_201568; NM_201569 NM_001331007; NM_001350219; NM_001350220; NM_001350221; NM_001350222; NM_001375584; NM_001375585	NM_001005507; NM_001160256; NM_001160257; NM_001359257
RefSeq (protein)	NP_001167532; NP_001317936; NP_775179; NP_963862; NP_963863 NP_001337148; NP_001337149; NP_001337150; NP_001337151; NP_001362513; NP_001362514	NP_001005507; NP_001153728; NP_001153729; NP_001346186
Location (UCSC)	Chr 1: 183.47 – 183.6 Mb	Chr 1: 152.71 – 152.78 Mb
PubMed search
- Wikidata
View/Edit Human	View/Edit Mouse

Protein SMG7 is a protein that in humans is encoded by the SMG7 gene.

== Function ==
It is primarily known for its role in non-sense-mediated mRNA decay (NMD). Unlike other NMD components, SMG7 proteins have undergone lineage-specific expansions during evolutions, demonstrating their capacity to evolve and acquire new functions.

== Clinical significance ==
Elevated of SMG7-AS1 (SMG7 antisense RNA 1, a long non-coding RNA gene associated with the SMG7 locus) are associated with a poorer clinical outcome in patients with skin cutaneous melanoma (SKCM). This suggests that SMG7-AS1 is a potential biomarker with for SKCM and could be used to predict to occurrence for tumor metastasis.
