= SMG1 =

Protein-coding gene in the species Homo sapiens

Identifiers
- Aliases: SMG1, 61E3.4, ATX, LIP, nonsense mediated mRNA decay associated PI3K related kinase, SMG1 nonsense mediated mRNA decay associated PI3K related kinase
- External IDs: OMIM: 607032; MGI: 1919742; GeneCards: SMG1
Enzyme activity
EC #	BRENDA	ExPASy	KEGG	MetaCyc
2.7.11.1	↗	↗	↗	↗

Gene location (Human)
Chr.	Chromosome 16 (human)
Band	16p12.3	Start	18,804,860 bp
Band	16p12.3	End	18,926,408 bp

Gene location (Mouse)
Chr.	Chromosome 7 (mouse)
Band	7|7 F1	Start	117,730,531 bp
Band	7|7 F1	End	117,842,893 bp
RNA expression pattern
Bgee	Human / Mouse (ortholog); Top expressed in: skin of thigh; sural nerve; epithelium of colon; skin of hip; Achilles tendon; epithelium of nasopharynx; parietal pleura; mucosa of sigmoid colon; visceral pleura; jejunal mucosa / Top expressed in: tail of embryo; genital tubercle; lobe of cerebellum; cerebellar vermis; mesenteric lymph nodes; medullary collecting duct; Rostral migratory stream; renal corpuscle; neural layer of retina; spermatocyte; More reference expression data
BioGPS	n/a
Gene ontology
Molecular function	telomeric DNA binding; ATP binding; protein kinase activity; protein binding; kinase activity; metal ion binding; nucleotide binding; transferase activity; protein serine/threonine kinase activity; RNA binding
Cellular component	nucleus; cytosol; cytoplasm; nucleoplasm
Biological process	response to stress; mRNA export from nucleus; nuclear-transcribed mRNA catabolic process, nonsense-mediated decay; peptidyl-serine phosphorylation; phosphatidylinositol phosphate biosynthetic process; cellular response to DNA damage stimulus; protein autophosphorylation; phosphorylation; regulation of telomere maintenance; DNA repair; regulation of response to DNA damage stimulus; protein phosphorylation
Sources:Amigo / QuickGO
Orthologs
Databases	NCBI: entry; OMA: entry
Species	Human	Mouse
Entrez	23049	233789
Ensembl	ENSG00000157106	ENSMUSG00000030655
UniProt	Q96Q15	Q8BKX6
RefSeq (mRNA)	NM_015092	NM_001031814; NM_177180
RefSeq (protein)	NP_055907	NP_001026984
Location (UCSC)	Chr 16: 18.8 – 18.93 Mb	Chr 7: 117.73 – 117.84 Mb
PubMed search
- Wikidata
View/Edit Human	View/Edit Mouse

Serine/threonine-protein kinase SMG1 is an enzyme that in humans is encoded by the SMG1 gene. SMG1 belongs to the phosphatidylinositol 3-kinase-related kinase protein family.

== Function ==
This gene encodes a protein involved in nonsense-mediated mRNA decay (NMD) as part of the mRNA surveillance complex. The protein has kinase activity and is thought to function in NMD by phosphorylating the regulator of nonsense transcripts 1 protein. Alternative spliced transcript variants have been described, but their full-length natures have not been determined.

== Interactions ==
SMG1 (gene) has been shown to interact with PRKCI and UPF1.
