= GSPT1 =

Protein-coding gene in the species Homo sapiens

Identifiers
- Aliases: GSPT1, 551G9.2, ETF3A, GST1, eRF3a, G1 to S phase transition 1
- External IDs: OMIM: 139259; MGI: 1316728; GeneCards: GSPT1
Available structures
PDB	Ortholog search: PDBe RCSB
PDB	List of PDB id codes 3E1Y, 3J5Y, 4D61, 5HXB

Gene location (Human)
Chr.	Chromosome 16 (human)
Band	16p13.13	Start	11,868,128 bp
Band	16p13.13	End	11,916,082 bp

Gene location (Mouse)
Chr.	Chromosome 16 (mouse)
Band	16 A1|16 6.38 cM	Start	11,037,156 bp
Band	16 A1|16 6.38 cM	End	11,072,189 bp
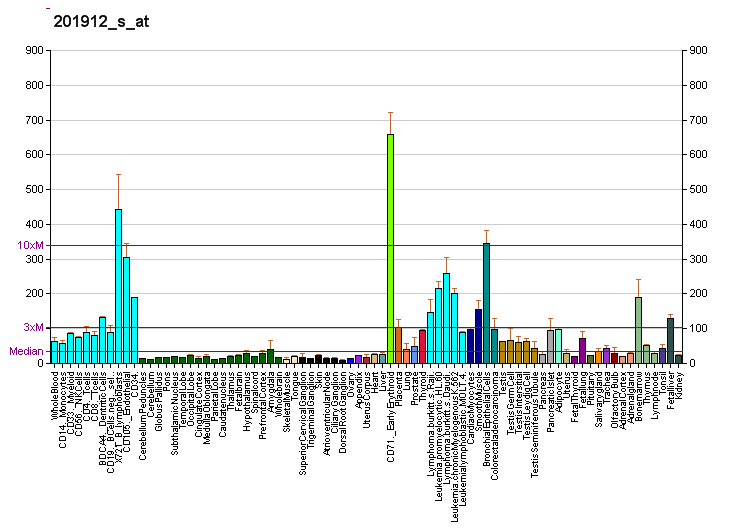

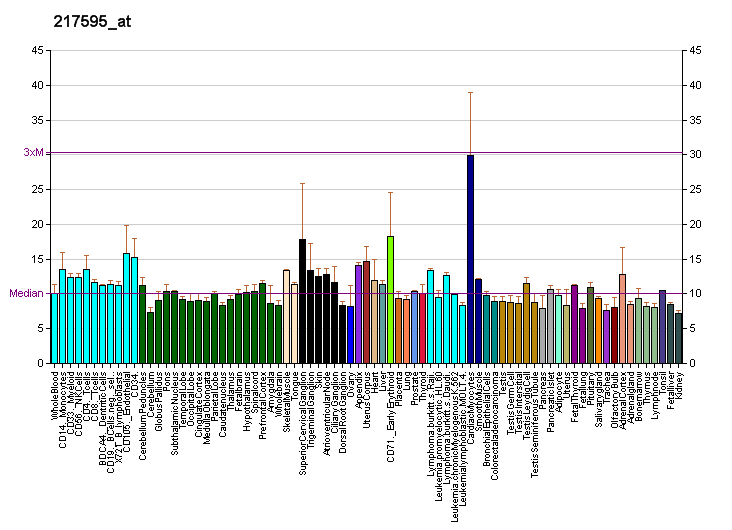

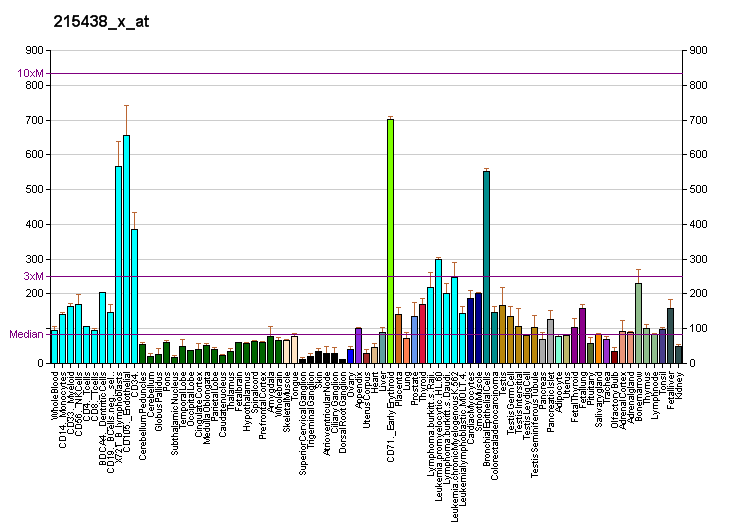
RNA expression pattern
Bgee	Human / Mouse (ortholog); Top expressed in: gingival epithelium; epithelium of colon; trabecular bone; islet of Langerhans; gastrocnemius muscle; ventricular zone; mucosa of sigmoid colon; blood; ganglionic eminence; parotid gland / Top expressed in: tail of embryo; epiblast; ventricular zone; abdominal wall; somite; primitive streak; dermis; endothelial cell of lymphatic vessel; morula; seminal vesicula; More reference expression data
BioGPS	More reference expression data
Gene ontology
Molecular function	nucleotide binding; GTP binding; translation release factor activity; protein binding; GTPase activity; RNA binding
Cellular component	translation release factor complex; intracellular anatomical structure; cytosol
Biological process	G1 phase; nuclear-transcribed mRNA catabolic process, nonsense-mediated decay; protein biosynthesis; cytoplasmic translational termination; protein methylation; translational termination; G1/S transition of mitotic cell cycle
Sources:Amigo / QuickGO
Orthologs
Databases	NCBI: entry; OMA: entry
Species	Human	Mouse
Entrez	2935	14852
Ensembl	ENSG00000103342	ENSMUSG00000062203
UniProt	P15170	Q8R050
RefSeq (mRNA)	NM_002094; NM_001130006; NM_001130007	NM_001130008; NM_146066
RefSeq (protein)	NP_001123478; NP_001123479; NP_002085	NP_001123480; NP_666178
Location (UCSC)	Chr 16: 11.87 – 11.92 Mb	Chr 16: 11.04 – 11.07 Mb
PubMed search
- Wikidata
View/Edit Human	View/Edit Mouse

Eukaryotic peptide chain release factor GTP-binding subunit ERF3A is an enzyme that in humans is encoded by the GSPT1 gene.

== Interactions ==
GSPT1 has been shown to interact with BIRC2.
