= UPF3B =

Protein-coding gene in the species Homo sapiens

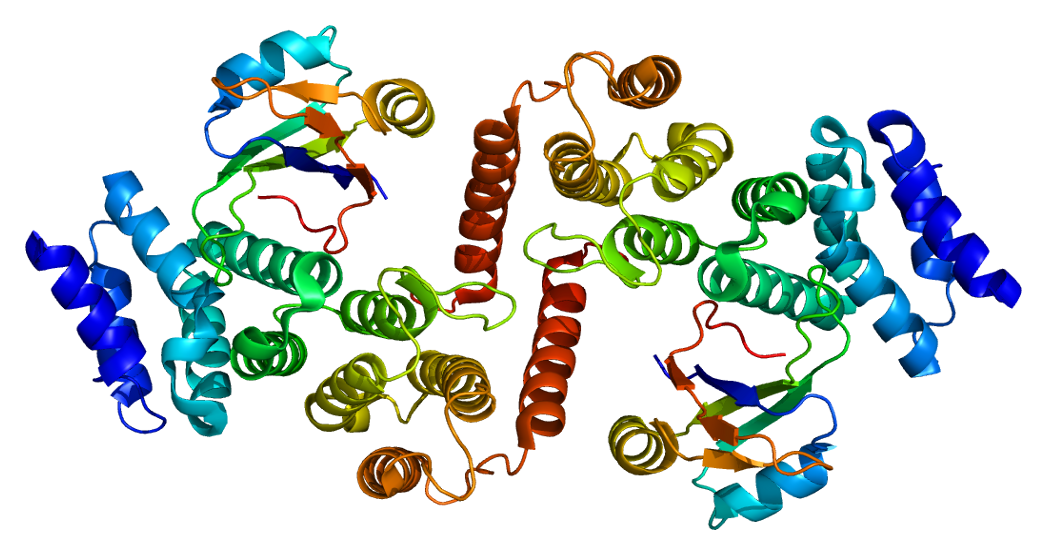
Available structures
PDB	Human UniProt search: PDBe RCSB
PDB	List of PDB id codes 1UW4, 2XB2

Identifiers
- Aliases: UPF3B, HMRX62, MRXS14, RENT3B, UPF3X, Upf3p-X, UPF3BP1, UPF3BP2, UPF3BP3, UPF3 regulator of nonsense transcripts homolog B (yeast), UPF3 regulator of nonsense transcripts homolog B, regulator of nonsense mediated mRNA decay, UPF3B regulator of nonsense mediated mRNA decay, MRX82
- External IDs: OMIM: 300298; MGI: 1915384; HomoloGene: 11307; GeneCards: UPF3B; OMA:UPF3B - orthologs

Gene location (Human)
Chr.	X chromosome (human)
Band	Xq24	Start	119,805,311 bp
Band	Xq24	End	119,852,998 bp

Gene location (Mouse)
Chr.	X chromosome (mouse)
Band	X|X A3.3	Start	37,091,678 bp
Band	X|X A3.3	End	37,110,322 bp
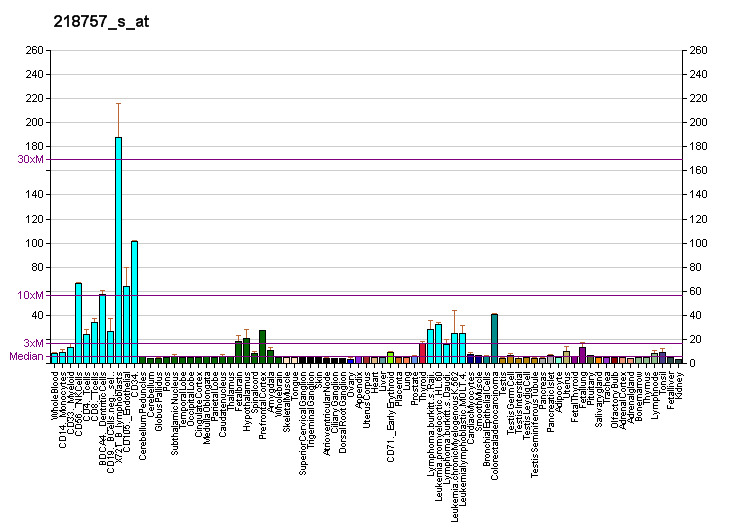
RNA expression pattern
Bgee	Human / Mouse (ortholog); Top expressed in: sural nerve; embryo; cerebellar hemisphere; ganglionic eminence; endothelial cell; amniotic fluid; right hemisphere of cerebellum; ventricular zone; testicle; visceral pleura / Top expressed in: Ileal epithelium; Paneth cell; neural layer of retina; pineal gland; medullary collecting duct; retinal pigment epithelium; epithelium of lens; islet of Langerhans; fossa; substantia nigra; More reference expression data
BioGPS	More reference expression data
Gene ontology
Molecular function	protein binding; mRNA binding; structural constituent of nuclear pore; nucleic acid binding; RNA binding
Cellular component	exon-exon junction complex; nucleoplasm; microtubule organizing center; nucleolus; nucleus; cytoplasm; cytosol
Biological process	mRNA splicing, via spliceosome; termination of RNA polymerase II transcription; mRNA transport; mRNA export from nucleus; positive regulation of translation; nuclear-transcribed mRNA catabolic process, nonsense-mediated decay; mRNA 3'-end processing; RNA export from nucleus; transport
Sources:Amigo / QuickGO
Orthologs
Species	Human	Mouse
Entrez	65109	68134
Ensembl	ENSG00000125351	ENSMUSG00000036572
UniProt	Q9BZI7	n/a
RefSeq (mRNA)	NM_023010; NM_080632	NM_026573
RefSeq (protein)	NP_075386; NP_542199	n/a
Location (UCSC)	Chr X: 119.81 – 119.85 Mb	Chr X: 37.09 – 37.11 Mb
PubMed search
- Wikidata
View/Edit Human	View/Edit Mouse

Regulator of nonsense transcripts 3B is a protein that in humans is encoded by the UPF3B gene.

This gene encodes a protein that is part of a post-splicing multiprotein complex involved in both mRNA nuclear export and mRNA surveillance. The encoded protein is one of two functional homologs to yeast Upf3p. mRNA surveillance detects exported mRNAs with truncated open reading frames and initiates nonsense-mediated mRNA decay (NMD). When translation ends upstream from the last exon-exon junction, this triggers NMD to degrade mRNAs containing premature stop codons. This protein binds to the mRNA and remains bound after nuclear export, acting as a nucleocytoplasmic shuttling protein. It forms with Y14 a complex that binds specifically 20 nt upstream of exon-exon junctions. This gene is located on the long arm of chromosome X. Two splice variants encoding different isoforms have been found for this gene.

== Interactions ==
UPF3B has been shown to interact with UPF2 and UPF1.
