= Oskar (gene) =

Gene required for the development of the Drosophila embryo

Maternal effect protein oskar

Identifiers
- Organism: Drosophila melanogaster
- Symbol: osk
- UniProt: P25158
Search for
- Structures: Swiss-model
- Domains: InterPro

oskar is a gene required for the development of the Drosophila embryo. It defines the posterior pole during early embryogenesis. Its two isoforms, short and long, play different roles in Drosophila embryonic development. oskar was named after the main character from the Günter Grass novel The Tin Drum, who refuses to grow up.

== Evolutionary history ==
oskar displays a unique evolutionary origin resulting from a Horizontal Domain Transfer from a probably bacterial endosymbiont onto an ancestral insect genome. The OSK domain is of bacterial origin and fused with the LOTUS domain through a linker domain. This event must have happened just prior to the divergence with the Crustacean, the insect's sister group, as oskar can be found as early as the Zygentoma but does not seem to exist in Crustacean.

== Translational-level regulation ==
oskar is translationally repressed prior to reaching the posterior pole of the oocyte by Bruno, which binds to three bruno response elements (BREs) on the 3' end of the transcribed oskar mRNA. The Bruno inhibitor has two distinct modes of action: recruiting the Cup eIF4E binding protein, which is also required for oskar mRNA localization due to interactions with the Barentsz microtubule-linked transporter, and promoting oligomerization of oskar mRNA. Oskar mRNA harbours a stem-loop structure in the 3'UTR, called the oocyte entry signal (OES), that promotes dynein-based mRNA accumulation in the oocyte.

== P granule formation ==
oskar plays role in recruiting other germ line genes to the germ plasm for PGC (primordial germ cell) specification. oskar mRNA locates to the posterior end of an oocyte and, once translated, the short isoform of oskar (Short oskar) recruits germ plasm components such as the protein Vasa and the RNA-binding proteins of the Piwi family, among many others. The long isoform of oskar (Long oskar) has been implicated in creating an actin network on the posterior pole end.

A second role has been discovered that relates to the formation of P granules, or germ granules. These ribonucleoprotein granules are found in every species' germ line cells. Although they are mobile, they typically localize to the nuclei and sit on nuclear pores. This positioning makes them ideal mRNA regulators, as the mRNA must pass through to exit the nucleus. Translational regulation also makes sense due to the granules' close association with ribosomes. These P granules are phase-transition entities, which means that they can display both liquid-like and hydrogel-like properties. This allows them to be very versatile structures, able to dissolve, condense, and exchange their protein content with their environment at will. Recent studies have shown that the short isoform of oskar has another function as the nucleator of nuclear germ granules. oskar recruits vasa to these round granules, then promotes the localization to the nucleus. oskar was ablated to explore the function of these nuclear germ granules. The results showed that the division of PGCs was compromised without oskar, meaning that the P granules play a role in the cell cycle of germ cells. It is still unclear exactly how the nuclear granules interact with certain factors and what factors (proteins, regulators, inhibitors) they interact with in order to regulate cell division.

== Domain families ==
OSK

Identifiers
- Symbol: OSK
- Pfam: PF17182
- InterPro: IPR033447
- CATH: 5a4a
Available protein structures:
- PDB: IPR033447 PF17182 (ECOD; PDBsum)
- AlphaFold: IPR033447; PF17182

OST-HTH/LOTUS

Identifiers
- Symbol: OST-HTH
- Pfam: PF12872
- InterPro: IPR025605
- PROSITE: PS51644
- CATH: 5a48
Available protein structures:
- PDB: IPR025605 PF12872 (ECOD; PDBsum)
- AlphaFold: IPR025605; PF12872

oskar contains two RNA-binding protein domains: the OSK RNA-binding domain and the OST-HTH/LOTUS domain. The former is structurally related to SGNH hydrolases but lack the active site residues. The latter is a winged helix-turn-helix domain also found in human TDRD5/TDRD7. The OST-HTH domain in oskar is mainly responsible for recruiting the Vasa helicase by binding to it.
