= UPF2 =

Protein-coding gene in the species Homo sapiens

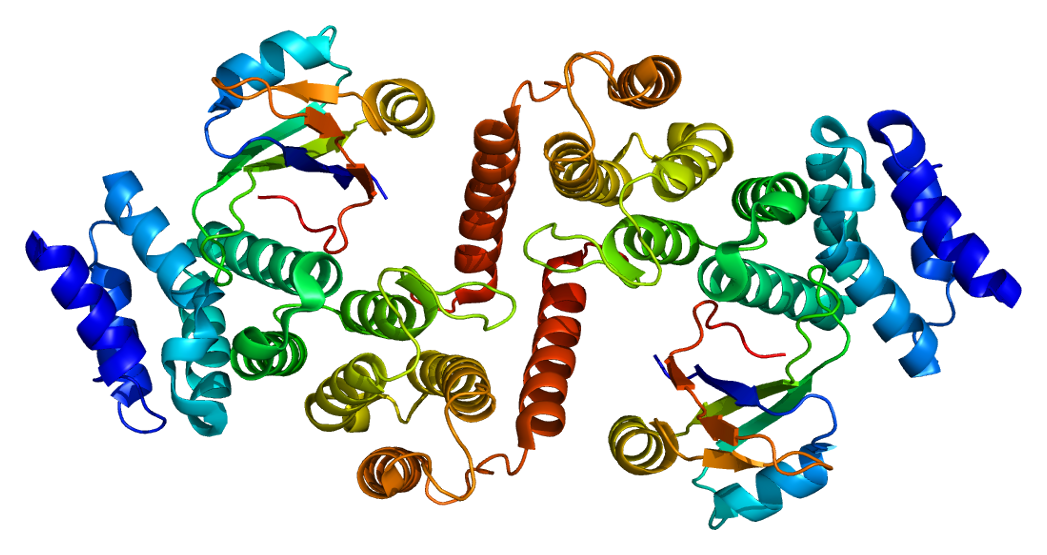

Identifiers
- Aliases: UPF2, HRENT2, smg-3, UPF2 regulator of nonsense transcripts homolog (yeast), regulator of nonsense mediated mRNA decay, UPF2 regulator of nonsense mediated mRNA decay
- External IDs: OMIM: 605529; MGI: 2449307; GeneCards: UPF2
Available structures
PDB	Ortholog search: PDBe RCSB
PDB	List of PDB id codes 1UW4, 2WJV, 4CEK, 4CEM

Gene location (Human)
Chr.	Chromosome 10 (human)
Band	10p14	Start	11,920,022 bp
Band	10p14	End	12,043,170 bp

Gene location (Mouse)
Chr.	Chromosome 2 (mouse)
Band	2|2 A1	Start	5,956,280 bp
Band	2|2 A1	End	6,061,514 bp
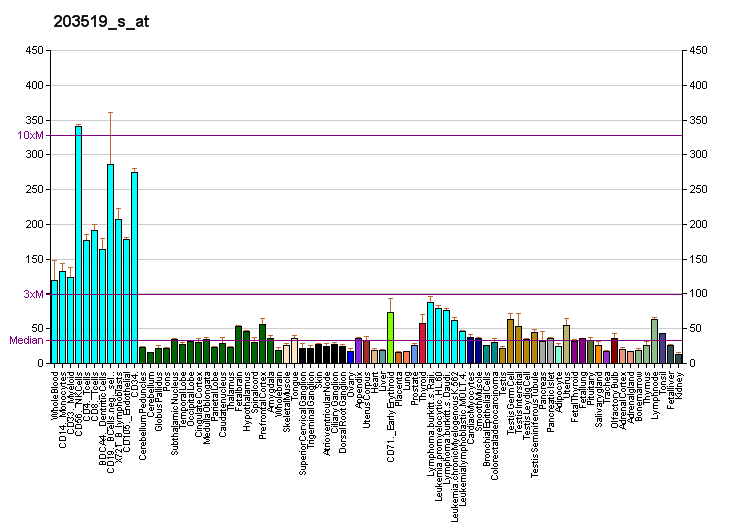
RNA expression pattern
Bgee	Human / Mouse (ortholog); Top expressed in: sural nerve; Achilles tendon; tendon of biceps brachii; internal globus pallidus; sperm; testicle; biceps brachii; ventricular zone; Skeletal muscle tissue of biceps brachii; Skeletal muscle tissue of rectus abdominis / Top expressed in: saccule; utricle; urothelium; motor neuron; ciliary body; primary oocyte; ectoderm; vestibular sensory epithelium; otic vesicle; transitional epithelium of urinary bladder; More reference expression data
BioGPS	More reference expression data
Gene ontology
Molecular function	protein binding; telomeric DNA binding; RNA binding
Cellular component	cytoplasm; perinuclear region of cytoplasm; exon-exon junction complex; nucleus; cytosol; polysome; cytoplasmic ribonucleoprotein granule
Biological process	liver development; nuclear-transcribed mRNA catabolic process, nonsense-mediated decay; mRNA export from nucleus; animal organ regeneration
Sources:Amigo / QuickGO
Orthologs
Databases	NCBI: entry; OMA: entry
Species	Human	Mouse
Entrez	26019	326622
Ensembl	ENSG00000151461	ENSMUSG00000043241
UniProt	Q9HAU5	A2AT37
RefSeq (mRNA)	NM_015542; NM_080599	NM_001081132
RefSeq (protein)	NP_056357; NP_542166	NP_001074601
Location (UCSC)	Chr 10: 11.92 – 12.04 Mb	Chr 2: 5.96 – 6.06 Mb
PubMed search
- Wikidata
View/Edit Human	View/Edit Mouse

Regulator of nonsense transcripts 2 is a protein that in humans is encoded by the UPF2 gene.

== Function ==
This gene encodes a protein that is part of a post-splicing multiprotein complex, the exon junction complex, involved in both mRNA nuclear export and mRNA surveillance. mRNA surveillance detects exported mRNAs with truncated open reading frames and initiates nonsense-mediated mRNA decay (NMD). When translation ends upstream from the last exon-exon junction, this triggers NMD to degrade mRNAs containing premature stop codons. This protein is located in the perinuclear area. It interacts with translation release factors and the proteins that are functional homologs of yeast Upf1p and Upf3p. Two splice variants have been found for this gene; both variants encode the same protein. UPF2 has recently been shown to alter adult behavior via alterations in hippocampal synaptic spine density and the late long-term potentiation of neurons.

== Interactions ==
UPF2 has been shown to interact with UPF1, UPF3A and UPF3B.
