= UPF1 =

Protein-coding gene in the species Homo sapiens

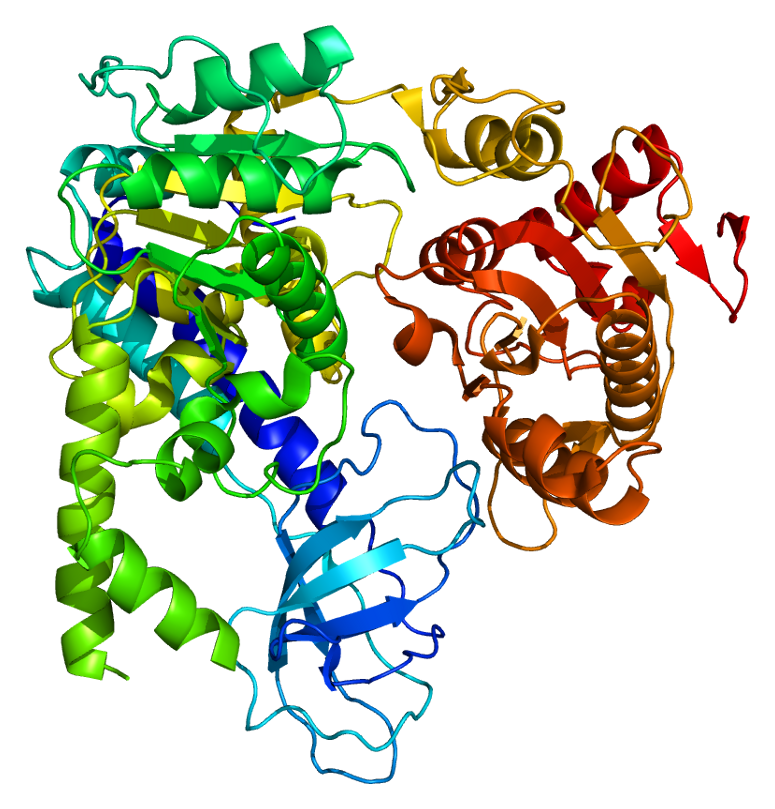

Identifiers
- Aliases: UPF1, HNORF1, RENT1, pNORF1, smg-2, RNA helicase and ATPase, UPF1 RNA helicase and ATPase, UTF
- External IDs: OMIM: 601430; MGI: 107995; GeneCards: UPF1
Available structures
| PDB | Ortholog search: PDBe RCSB |
| PDB | List of PDB id codes 2GJK, 2GK6, 2GK7, 2IYK, 2WJV, 2WJY, 2XZO, 2XZP |
Enzyme activity
| EC # | BRENDA | ExPASy | KEGG | MetaCyc |
|---|---|---|---|---|
| 5.6.2.3 | ↗ | ↗ | ↗ | ↗ |
| 5.6.2.5 | ↗ | ↗ | ↗ | ↗ |

Gene location (Human)
| Chr. | Chromosome 19 (human) |
| Band | 19p13.11 | Start | 18,831,959 bp |
| Band | 19p13.11 | End | 18,868,230 bp |

Gene location (Mouse)
| Chr. | Chromosome 8 (mouse) |
| Band | 8 B3.3|8 34.15 cM | Start | 70,784,175 bp |
| Band | 8 B3.3|8 34.15 cM | End | 70,805,928 bp |
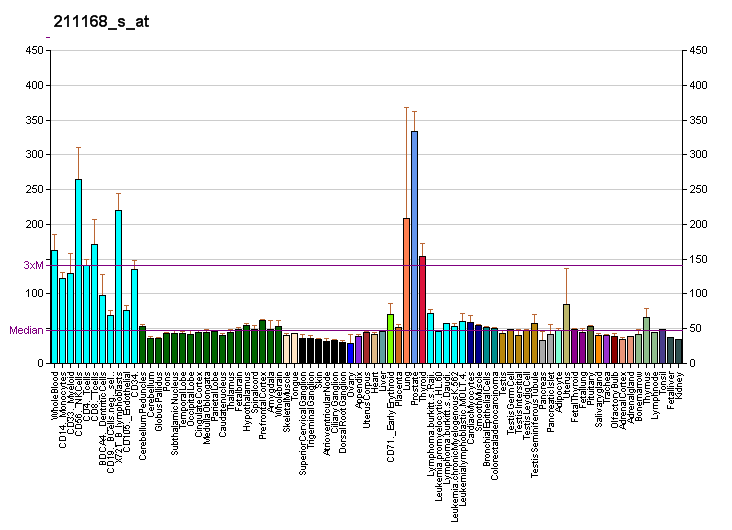

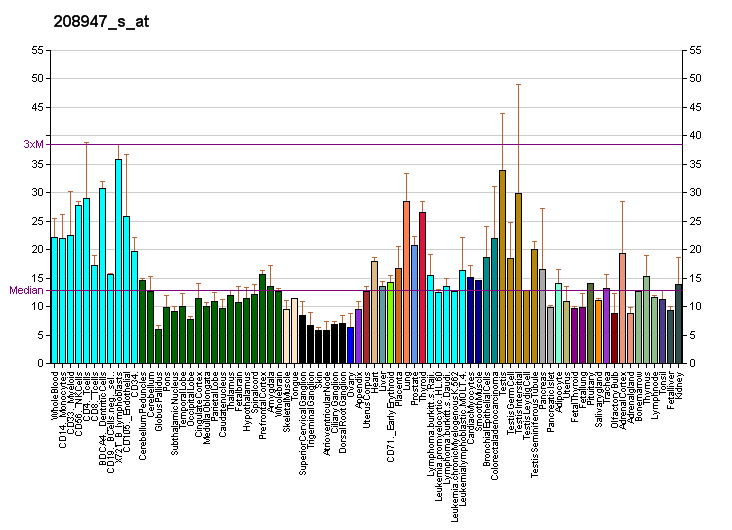
RNA expression pattern
| Bgee | Human / Mouse (ortholog); Top expressed in: right hemisphere of cerebellum; mucosa of transverse colon; olfactory zone of nasal mucosa; granulocyte; skin of leg; anterior pituitary; right uterine tube; right testis; right lobe of thyroid gland; stromal cell of endometrium / Top expressed in: spermatocyte; aortic valve; granulocyte; lip; ascending aorta; secondary oocyte; ventricular zone; yolk sac; muscle of thigh; neural layer of retina; More reference expression data |
| BioGPS | More reference expression data |
Gene ontology
| Molecular function | nucleotide binding; DNA binding; telomeric DNA binding; zinc ion binding; chromatin binding; metal ion binding; protein binding; hydrolase activity; ATP binding; helicase activity; RNA binding |
| Cellular component | cytosol; P-body; exon-exon junction complex; supraspliceosomal complex; nucleoplasm; chromatin; cytoplasm; nucleus |
| Biological process | regulation of translational termination; telomere maintenance via semi-conservative replication; positive regulation of mRNA catabolic process; mRNA export from nucleus; DNA replication; nuclear-transcribed mRNA catabolic process; cellular response to interleukin-1; nuclear-transcribed mRNA catabolic process, endonucleolytic cleavage-dependent decay; histone mRNA catabolic process; dosage compensation by inactivation of X chromosome; cellular response to lipopolysaccharide; 3'-UTR-mediated mRNA destabilization; DNA repair; nuclear-transcribed mRNA catabolic process, nonsense-mediated decay; regulation of telomere maintenance; cell cycle phase transition; viral process |
Sources:Amigo / QuickGO
Orthologs
| Databases | NCBI: entry; OMA: entry |
| Species | Human | Mouse |
| Entrez | 5976 | 19704 |
| Ensembl | ENSG00000005007 | ENSMUSG00000058301 |
| UniProt | Q92900 | Q9EPU0 |
| RefSeq (mRNA) | NM_002911; NM_001297549 | NM_001122829; NM_030680 |
| RefSeq (protein) | NP_001284478; NP_002902; NP_001284478.1 | NP_001116301; NP_109605 |
| Location (UCSC) | Chr 19: 18.83 – 18.87 Mb | Chr 8: 70.78 – 70.81 Mb |
| PubMed search |
- Wikidata
| View/Edit Human | View/Edit Mouse |

Regulator of nonsense transcripts 1 (or Up-frameshift suppressor 1 homolog) is a protein that in humans is encoded by the UPF1 gene.

== Function ==
This gene encodes a protein that is part of a post-splicing multiprotein complex, the exon junction complex, involved in both mRNA nuclear export and mRNA surveillance. mRNA surveillance detects exported mRNAs with truncated open reading frames and initiates nonsense-mediated mRNA decay (NMD). When translation ends upstream from the last exon-exon junction, this triggers NMD to degrade mRNAs containing premature stop codons. This protein is located in both the cytoplasm and nucleus. When translation ends, it interacts with the functional homolog of yeast Upf2p to trigger mRNA decapping. Use of multiple polyadenylation sites has been noted for this gene.

== Interactions ==
UPF1 interacts with:

- DCP1A,
- DCP2,
- SMG1,
- UPF2,
- UPF3A, and
- UPF3B.
