= Decapping complex =

Eukaryotic protein complex that removes the 5' cap on mRNA

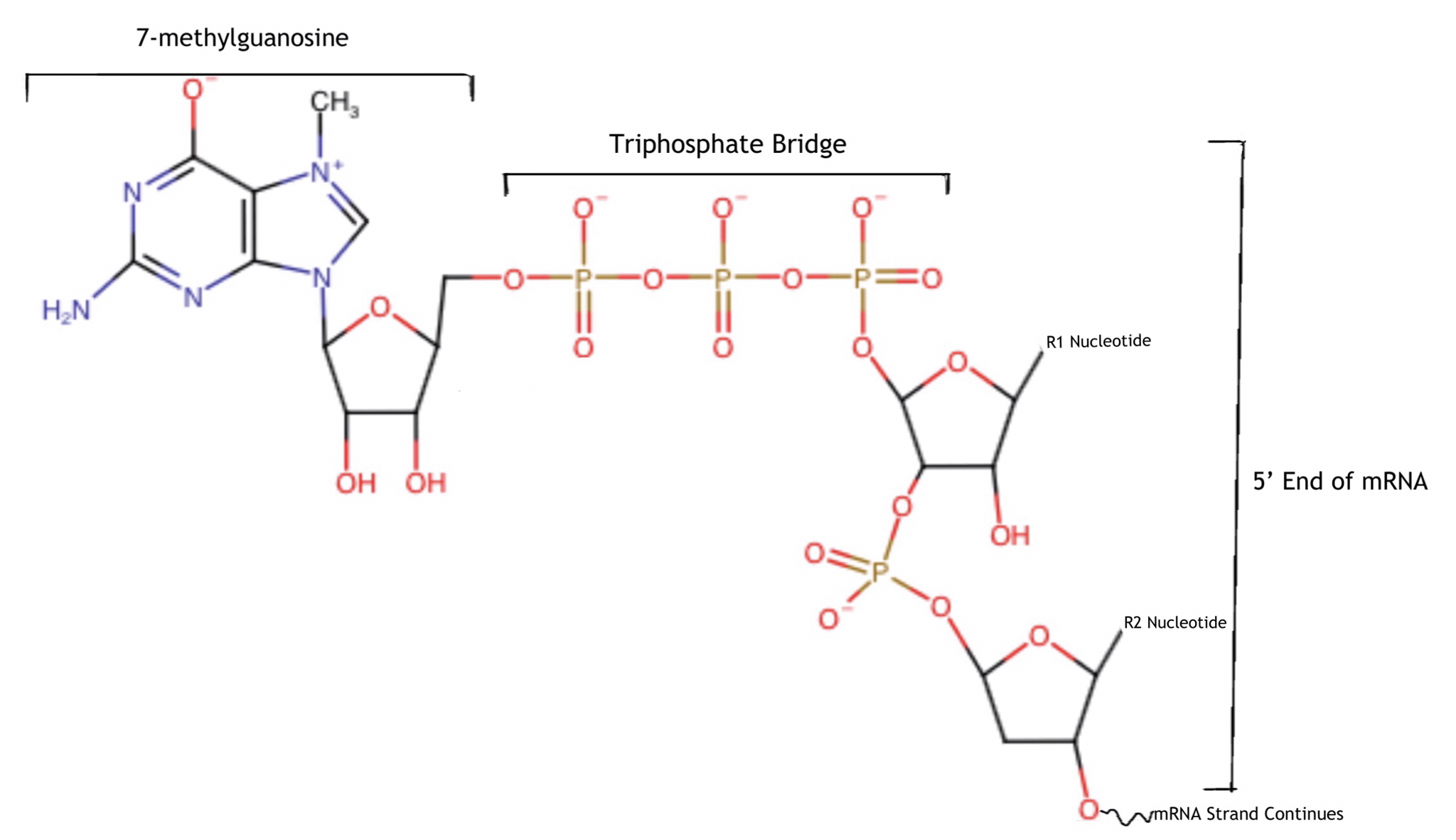
The chemical structure of the 5' capped mRNA, with labeled portions that indicate where several key structures involved with decapping mRNA are.

The mRNA decapping complex is a protein complex in eukaryotic cells responsible for removal of the 5' cap. The active enzyme of the decapping complex is the bilobed Nudix family enzyme Dcp2, which hydrolyzes 5' cap and releases 7mGDP and a 5'-monophosphorylated mRNA. This decapped mRNA is inhibited for translation and will be degraded by exonucleases. The core decapping complex is conserved in eukaryotes. Dcp2 is activated by Decapping Protein 1 (Dcp1) and in higher eukaryotes joined by the scaffold protein VCS. Together with many other accessory proteins, the decapping complex assembles in P-bodies in the cytoplasm.

== Purpose of the decapping complex ==
mRNA needs to be degraded, or else it will keep floating around the cell and create unwanted proteins at random. The mRNA 5' cap is specifically designed to keep mRNA from being degraded before it can be used, and so needs to be removed so the mRNA decay pathway can take care of it.

== Decapping mechanism ==
Dcp2 is the protein that actually decaps mRNA, and the rest of proteins in the complex enhance its function and allow it to hydrolyze the chemical bond attaching the mRNA to the 5' cap. The Nudix domain in Dcp2 hydrolyzes one of the bonds on the triphosphate bridge that hooks the mRNA and the 5' cap together, causing the 7-methylguanosine cap to come off and leaving the mRNA open to degradation by the exonucleases in the cell.

== Structure of the decapping complex ==
Both single-celled and multicellular organisms need to decap their mRNA to get rid of it, but different organisms have slightly different proteins that carry out this process. There are many proteins that stay the same, but several key differences between the single-celled (yeast) and multicellular (metazoan) decapping complexes.

=== Yeast decapping complex ===
In yeast (S. cerevisiae), Dcp2 is joined by the decapping activator Dcp1, the helicase Dhh1, the exonuclease Xrn1, nonsense mediated decay factors Upf1, Upf2, and Upf3, the LSm complex, Pat1, and various other proteins. These proteins all localize to cytoplasmic structures called P-bodies. Notably in yeast there are no translation factors or ribosomal proteins inside P-bodies.

=== Metazoan decapping complex ===
Higher eukaryotes have slightly different members of the decapping complex. The enzyme Dcp2 is still the catalytic subunit which forms a holoenzyme with Dcp1, and interacts with auxiliary proteins such as Xrn1, Upf1, Upf2, Upf3, the LSm complex, and the Dhh1 ortholog DDX6. Proteins unique to plants and mammals include the beta propeller protein Hedls and the enhancer of decapping Edc3. Researchers know how the complex physically associates because of immunoprecipitation, while structural details of each part of the complex have been discovered by using x-ray crystallography in conjunction with protein crystallization. Each of these proteins contribute different things to the decapping complex, as discussed below.

==== Dcp2 ====
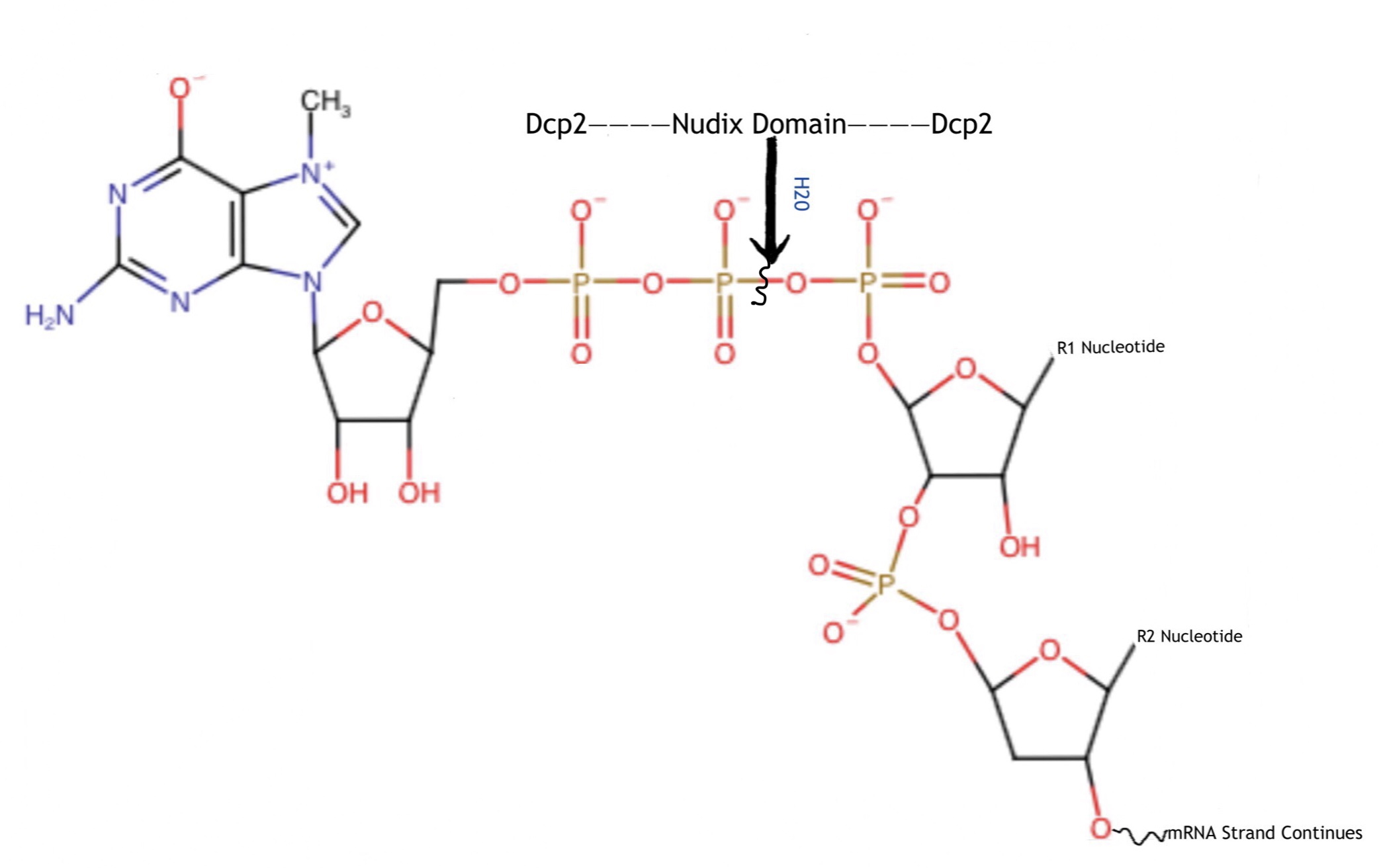
The chemical structure of capped mRNA, showing how the decapping complex interacts with the 5' cap. It is the Dcp2 enzyme, specifically its Nudix domain, that hydrolyzes a phosphate bond and removes the cap.

Dcp2, as the main catalyst of the decapping process, relies on a specific pattern of amino acids called a nudix domain to align itself with the 5' cap in order to hydrolyze it. A nudix domain is made by packing two beta sheets between multiple alpha helices, can be various lengths and sizes, and is generally used by proteins to carry out dephosphorylation, getting rid of a phosphate by inserting a water molecule into the bond between the phosphate and the rest of the molecule. In the case of Dcp2, it contains multiple glutamic acid side chains that are negatively charged in normal cellular conditions, and these are what allow the protein to manipulate water molecules to hydrolyze the tri-phosphate bridge that connects the 5' end of the mRNA to the 7-methylguanosine cap. Therefore, the nudix domain is what allows Dcp2 to remove the 5' cap, which results in the creation 7mGDP, a 7-methylguanosine with two phosphate groups attached, and a monophosphorylated mRNA strand.

Before the nudix domain is an N-terminal regulatory domain (NRD), which further helps hydrolyze the 5' mRNA cap. After the nudix domain is a C-terminal area called Box B, which helps bind Dcp2 to RNA. With all three of these main motifs, Dcp2 is able to find, bind firmly to, and hydrolyzes a 5' mRNA cap. It does this either by recognizing a hairpin loop in the RNA within 10 base pairs of the cap, which is called a Dcp2 binding and decapping element, or by a separate protein recognizing a base pair pattern in the mRNA and directly recruiting the Dcp2-Dcp1 holoenzyme. Unfortunately, Dcp2 works slowly, and needs a few other proteins to coordinate with it so it can decap mRNA in a timely manner.

==== Dcp1 ====
Dcp1 is a regulatory subunit, it combines with Dcp2, creating a holoenzyme that can decap mRNA properly. Without Dcp1, it is actually impossible for Dcp2 to decap anything in vivo, and it only works incredibly slowly in vitro, which makes forming this holoenzyme an essential process in decapping.

Dcp1's secondary structure consists of seven beta sheets and three alpha helices. which come together to form a V-shaped tertiary structure. The defining features of Dcp1 are the EVH1 domain and a domain that recognises proline rich sequences (PRS) on other proteins. The EVH1 domain interacts directly with the earlier mentioned NRD of Dcp2, and is currently thought to directly help with the decapping of mRNA, though how it does so is unclear. The domain that recognises PRS is made of mostly hydrophobic amino acids, and is found within the cleft of the 'V' of the Dcp1 structure. It is used to bind to other proteins in the decapping complex to Dcp1.

==== PNRC2 ====
PNRC2 attaches to and enhances the effect of Dcp1 to encourage decapping, and also recruits Upf1 to the decapping complex. It possesses a proline rich sequence that is hydrophobic and sticks strongly to the equally hydrophobic cleft in Dcp1, and so Dcp1 binds PNRC2's proline-rich region, which then enhances the function of Dcp2 even more. Current research suggests PNRC2 helps associate Dcp2 and Dcp1 together, making the Dcp2-Dcp1 holoenzyme more stable and therefore increasing the effectiveness of Dcp2, but the exact details about how it does so are vague. The recruitment of Upf1 allows the decapping complex to participate in nonsense-mediated mRNA decay, which makes PNRC2 a way for Dcp2 to connect with the regulatory pathway in charge of destroying incorrectly transcripted mRNA.

==== Upf1-3 ====
Upf1, Upf2, and Upf3 are proteins involved in the regulatory pathway of nonsense-mediated mRNA decay, and not the actual decapping of mRNA. Only Upf1 attaches directly to the decapping complex, whereas Upf2 and Upf3 attach to mRNA, then attach to Upf1 to facilitate the destruction of incorrect mRNA. These are activators of the complex, in that they can direct the complex at incorrectly formed mRNA, but do not actually help decap the mRNA.

==== DDX6 ====
DDX6, an ortholog of Dhh1, also enhances the effectiveness of the Dcp2-Dcp1 holoenzyme while it hydrolyzes the 5' cap. It is proposed that, since it is a helicase, it is involved in reconfiguring the 5' end of the mRNA to give Dcp2 easier access to the 5' cap, and that it stimulates Dcp1 so that it interacts better with Dcp2 when attached to the rest of the decapping complex.

==== Edc3 ====
Edc3 further activates the Dcp2-Dcp1 holoenzyme and allows it to quickly decap mRNA. It possesses an LSm domain at its N-terminus, which interacts with specific amino acid motifs called HLM fragments which are found on the C terminus of Dcp1 and allows for Edc3 to bind to it. Another important part of this protein is the FDF linker, which is a long and unstructured stretch of amino acids that binds with DDX6 and stops it from binding directly with the mRNA, allowing it to interact with the proteins in the decapping complex instead. The final domain of note is a Yjef-N C-terminus domain which dimerizes with mRNA and helps create P-bodies around the location of the decapping complex.

P-bodies are biomolecular condensates rich in decapped or repressed mRNA mixed together with mRNA degradation factors, such as the decapping complex and the nonsense-mediated mRNA decay machinery, so they are important for the eventual destruction of the mRNA altered by Dcp2. As Edc3 creates P-bodies around the decapping complex, it becomes easier for Dcp2 to access the mRNA 5' caps to hydrolyze, increasing the effectiveness of the entire complex.

==== Pat1 ====
Pat1 is another protein that increases the efficiency of the decapping complex. It has three main domains. One is necessary for decapping mRNA, and directly helps the Dcp2-Dcp1 holoenzyme do so. The other two make it easier for the protein to decap mRNA, but are not directly involved in the hydrolysis of the phosphate bond. Pat1 enhances binding of the 3′ complex to RNA and activates the 5′ decapping complex by multiple mechanisms including promoting phase separation. Pat1 has many interactions with the various proteins in the decapping complex, and is known as the 'scaffolding protein' because it brings everything together when it is time to decap something. The N-terminus domain interacts with DXX6 and brings it close so it can activate Dcp1, another portion helps create P-bodies along with Edc3, and the C-terminus domains attach Dcp1–Dcp2, the Lsm1–7 complex and Xrn1 to the complex.

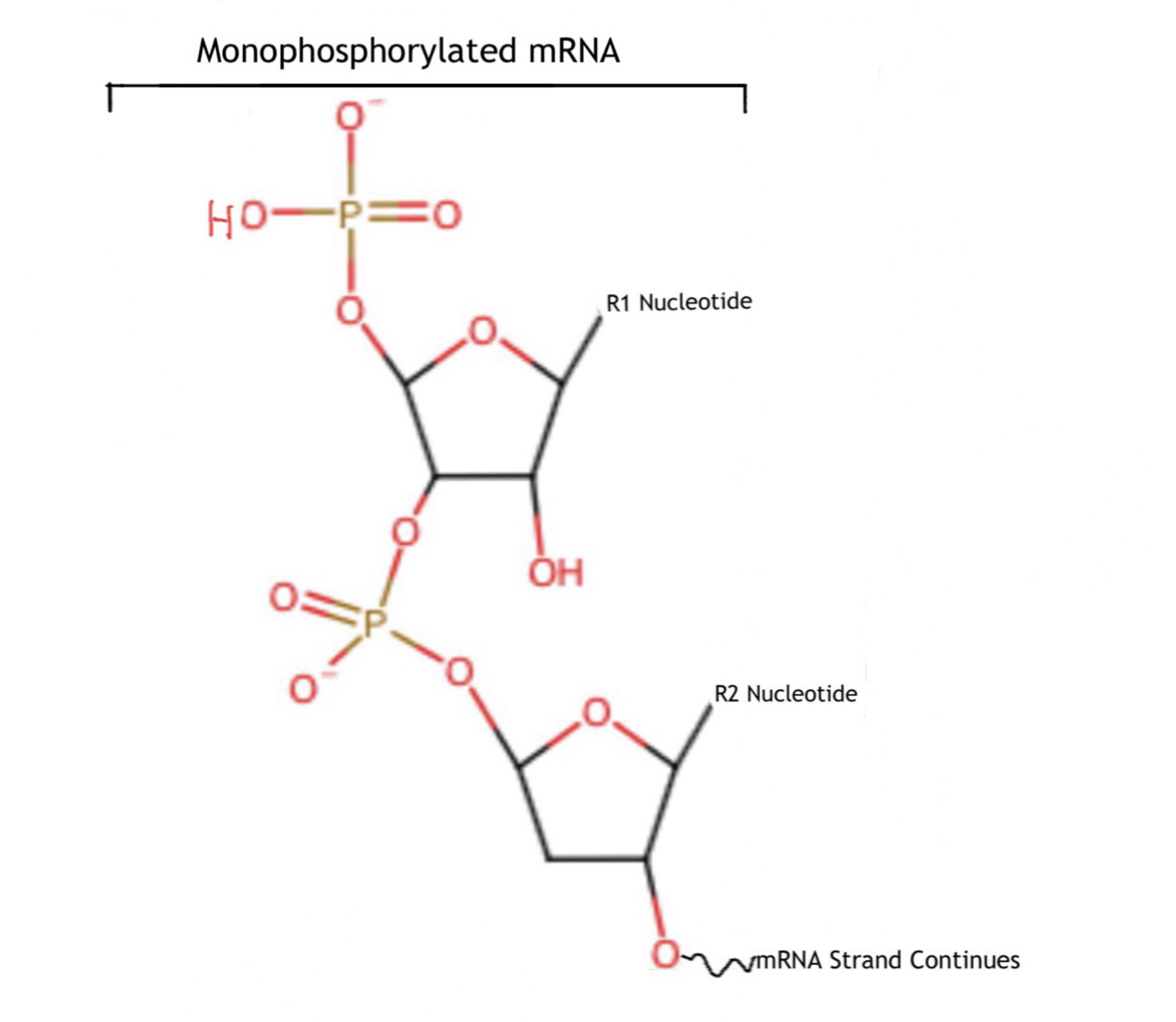
The chemical structure of monophosphorylated mRNA, which is what is left over when the decapping complex removes the 5' cap and removes 7mGDP from the rest of the mRNA.

==== Xrn1 ====
Xrn1 is a 5' to 3' exonuclease that degrades the just-decapped mRNA. It targets the 5' monophosphate end of mRNA, which is what is left over when Dcp2 has hydrolyzed the cap off and taken away the 7-methylguanosine cap, along with two of the three phosphates that attach the cap to the mRNA. The current theory is that the structure of Xrn1 does not allow a capped mRNA to interact with it because the Xrn1 is structured in such a way that there is steric hindrance that physically blocks the protein from interacting with any mRNA that Dcp2 has not already decapped.
