= M7GpppN-mRNA hydrolase =

Type of enzyme

Identifiers
- EC no.: 3.6.1.62

Databases
- BRENDA: enzyme data
- ExPASy: NiceZyme view
- KEGG: enzyme entry
- MetaCyc: metabolic pathway
- Rhea: reactions
- PDB structures: RCSB PDB PDBe PDBsum
Search
- PMC: articles
- PubMed: articles
- NCBI: proteins

M7GpppN-mRNA hydrolase (EC 3.6.1.62, D10 protein, D9 protein, D10 decapping enzyme, decapping enzyme) is an enzyme with systematic name m7GpppN-mRNA m7GDP phosphohydrolase. This enzyme catalyses the following chemical reaction

m7G5'ppp5'-mRNA + H_{2}O $\rightleftharpoons$ m7GDP + 5'-phospho-mRNA

Decapping of mRNA is essential in eukaryotic mRNA turnover. In humans, this type of enzyme activity has been reported for the proteins NUDT3, NUDT16, NUDT17, DCP1A, DCP1B, and DCP2.
