= 8-oxo-dGDP phosphatase =

Class of enzymes

Identifiers
- EC no.: 3.6.1.58

Databases
- BRENDA: enzyme data
- ExPASy: NiceZyme view
- KEGG: enzyme entry
- MetaCyc: metabolic pathway
- Rhea: reactions
- PDB structures: RCSB PDB PDBe PDBsum
Search
- PMC: articles
- PubMed: articles
- NCBI: proteins

8-oxo-dGDP phosphatase (EC 3.6.1.58, NUDT5) is a mammalian enzyme with systematic name 8-oxo-dGDP phosphohydrolase. It catalyses the hydrolysis of 8-oxo-deoxyguanosine diphosphate (8-oxo-dGDP) to the corresponding monophosphate (8-oxo-dGMP) and orthophosphate (P_{i})

8-oxo-dGDP
H_{2}O
P_{i}
8-oxo-dGMP

The role of the enzyme is to remove oxidised nucleoside diphosphates so that they cannot be mis-incorporated into DNA or RNA. Both guanosine and deoxyguanosine versions are substrates of the enzyme. The enzyme is one of a group of related NUDIX hydrolase enzymes which have similar functions, with 2-hydroxy-dATP diphosphatase acting on oxidised deoxyadenosine triphosphate.
