= YjeF N terminal protein domain =

YjeF_N
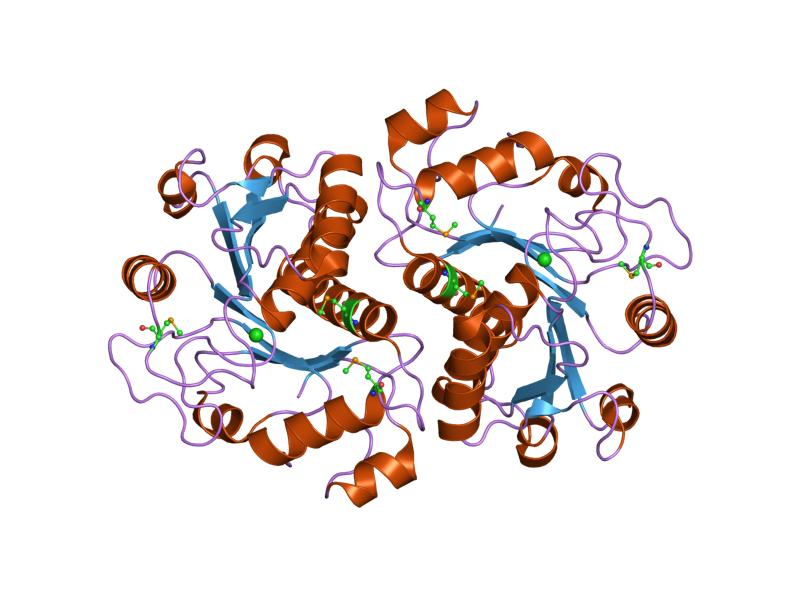
- crystal structure of yeast ynu0, ynl200c

Identifiers
- Symbol: YjeF_N
- Pfam: PF03853
- InterPro: IPR004443
- SCOP2: 1jzt / SCOPe / SUPFAM
Available protein structures:
- PDB: IPR004443 PF03853 (ECOD; PDBsum)
- AlphaFold: IPR004443; PF03853

In molecular biology, the YjeF N terminal is a protein domain found in the N-terminal of the protein, EDC3. The YjeF N-terminal domains occur either as single proteins or fusions with other domains and are commonly associated with enzymes. They help assemble the processing body (P-body) in preparation for mRNAdecay. Structural homology indicated it may have some similarity to the enzyme family, hydrolase.

== Function ==
At the cellular level, the YjeF-N terminal domain is vital to the assembly of the processing body (P-body). This aids mRNA decay and is thought to bring together different complexes to aggregate mRNPs. At the organism level, in bacteria and archaea, YjeF N-terminal domains are often fused to a YjeF C-terminal domain with high structural homology to the members of a ribokinase-like superfamily or belong to operons that encode enzymes of diverse functions. Examples of such include:

- pyridoxal phosphate biosynthetic protein PdxJ;
- phosphopanteine-protein transferase;
- ATP/GTP hydrolase;
- and pyruvate-formate lyase 1-activating enzyme.

In plants, the YjeF N-terminal domain is fused to a C-terminal putative pyridoxamine 5'-phosphate oxidase. In eukaryotes, proteins that consist of (Sm)-FDF-YjeF N-terminal domains may be involved in RNA processing.

== Structure ==
The YjeF N-terminal domains represent a novel version of the Rossmann fold, one of the most common protein folds in nature. The YjeF N-terminal domain is a three-layer alpha-beta-alpha sandwich with a central beta-sheet surrounded by alpha helices. The conservation of the acidic residues in the predicted active site of the YjeF N-terminal domains shows some similarities to the amino acids found in the active sites of diverse hydrolases.
