= NAD+ diphosphatase =

Class of enzymes

NAD^{+} diphosphatase

Identifiers
- EC no.: 3.6.1.22
- CAS no.: 37289-33-1

Databases
- BRENDA: enzyme data
- ExPASy: NiceZyme view
- KEGG: enzyme entry
- MetaCyc: metabolic pathway
- Rhea: reactions
- PDB structures: RCSB PDB PDBe PDBsum
- Gene Ontology: AmiGO / QuickGO
Search
- PMC: articles
- PubMed: articles
- NCBI: proteins

NAD^{+} diphosphatase (EC 3.6.1.22) is an enzyme characterised from mosquitoes and Proteus vulgaris that catalyzes the hydrolysis of nicotinamide adenine dinucleotide and related dinucleotides to adenosine monophosphate and nicotinamide mononucleotide:

nicotinamide adenine dinucleotide
H_{2}O
adenosine monophosphate
+
nicotinamide mononucleotide

The enzyme is a member of the so-called Nudix hydrolase family of hydrolase and is found in plants, animals, and bacteria. The group has a conserved amino acid sequence required for catalysis named the Nudix box.

The systematic name of this enzyme class is NAD^{+} phosphohydrolase. Other names in use include nicotinamide adenine dinucleotide pyrophosphatase, NADP+ pyrophosphatase, and NADH pyrophosphatase.

== Structural studies ==
As of late 2007, only one structure has been solved for this class of enzymes, with the PDB accession code PDB: 2GB5.
