= Translational efficiency =

In cell biology, translational efficiency or translation efficiency is the rate of mRNA translation into proteins within cells.

It has been measured in protein per mRNA per hour. Several RNA elements within mRNAs have been shown to affect the rate. These include miRNA and protein binding sites. RNA structure may also affect translational efficiency through the altered protein or microRNA binding.

In fungi, it has been shown that it influences fitness, by reducing the lag phase time, and is associated with pathogenesis.

== See also ==
- List of cis-regulatory RNA elements
- Transterm
- UTRdb
