= Prokaryotic mRNA degradation =

Gene regulation in single-cell organisms

Prokaryotic messenger RNA (mRNA) degradation, also called prokaryotic mRNA decay, is an important part of gene regulation in prokaryotes.. In this process, specific proteins target and break down mRNA. These proteins break down certain sections of the mRNA, such as 5’ ends and specific base pairs. This degradation happens in response to different environmental cues, allowing the organism to stop expressing certain genes in order to survive. This also occurs during and after translation, in order to reuse the material that was used to create the RNA. This process can vary, depending on the organism and the situation.

mRNA degradation targets specific sequences of messenger RNA, allowing some to stay in the cell for longer than others—and even genes within the same strand of RNA can be degraded at different rates. This is true in both prokaryotes and eukaryotes. Because of this, mRNA degradation plays a key role in determining which genes are expressed. Also, this process gives organisms greater evolutionary fitness, as it means they do not have to expend energy to find new resources.

== Ribonucleases: E, G, and Y ==
Often, mRNA is degraded by proteins called ribonucleases, which separate the 5’ end of the RNA from the 3’ end of the RNA; there are several different kinds of ribonucleases, which appear in different organisms.

One main ribonuclease in prokaryotes is called ribonuclease E, and another ribonuclease that degrades RNA in prokaryotes is called ribonuclease G. It is a homolog of ribonuclease E. This was determined mainly by studies that focused on Escherichia coli (E. coli), and this is not the case in all situations. For example, stem-loops, another part of mRNA, are not degraded by ribonucleases, but it is not known how they are degraded.

Many species of bacteria do not create ribonuclease E or a homolog of it. Some species of bacteria use a ribonuclease called ribonuclease Y, which is not a homolog of ribonuclease E. Its structure is different from that of ribonuclease E, though they perform the same function in the cell.

One study found that in Bacillus subtilis, ribonuclease Y targeted different areas in RNA. The researchers that carried out this study grew samples of multiple strains of Bacillus subtilis, and then separated proteins from the rest of the cell material. After that, they analyzed the proteins. They found that in Bacillus subtilis, ribonuclease Y affected around 900 mRNA sequences. 550 of those went up in abundance, and 350 of them decreased. This means that genes are affected by ribonuclease Y in this species, though not all of them are affected in the same way.

== Ribonuclease III ==
Some bacteria use a ribonuclease called ribonuclease III. Robertson et al. found that ribonuclease III is a ribonuclease that works to decay double-stranded RNA specifically. The researchers who conducted this study treated samples of E. coli with a mixture of chemicals. They found that when treated with these chemicals, some of the RNA would dissolve, but not all of it. They then analyzed the RNA that did not dissolve, and found that it only worked on double-stranded RNA.

Ribonuclease III has been studied more since. Further study of it has led to greater understanding of the mechanics of double-stranded RNA. However, it is also now known that this protein plays a smaller part in gene regulation than ribonucleases E and Y.

== Processes of decay ==
Prokaryotic mRNA decay can happen in response to stressors. These stressors include temperature, oxidative stress, and drug treatments. One study found that in 96 different species of bacteria, including E.coli, mRNA degradation occurred in response to oxidative stress, as well as to a drug treatment. mRNA can degrade/decay at multiple steps in the process of creating a protein. It can also decay while it is in the process of being translated, as Dihub Pelechano et al. who found, by analyzing samples of Saccharomyces cerevisiae. Based on the data from the ribosomes, mRNA degradation occurred in specific sites in the RNA that was being translated.

However, not all species are able to degrade mRNA fast enough to survive. One study found that in a temperature-sensitive strain of E. coli, there was a mutation that could be lethal: the RNA in this strain of E. coli degraded much slower than in other strains. The researchers who conducted this study exposed samples of the strain to different temperatures, and analyzed the decay of its RNA, comparing it to a temperature-resistant strain. They found that in the temperature-sensitive strain, RNA decayed slower than in the temperature-resistant strain, meaning that temperature sensitivity in the temperature-sensitive strain may have been due to the accumulation of RNA in the cell.

== Vaccines ==
Prokaryotic mRNA degradation poses a difficulty to researchers developing mRNA vaccines. This is the case because the degradation means that mRNA is not stable, and might not deliver the vaccine effectively; this problem has been combated by chemically modifying mRNA, using several different kinds of chemicals, such as lipids, lipid-like materials, polymers, and lipid-polymer hybrids, but it has not been solved yet.

Despite these challenges, research marches on for various possible mRNA vaccines and immunotherapies. These include ones for cancer, ones for infectious diseases, and ones for genetic diseases.
