= NUDT5 =

Protein-coding gene in the species Homo sapiens

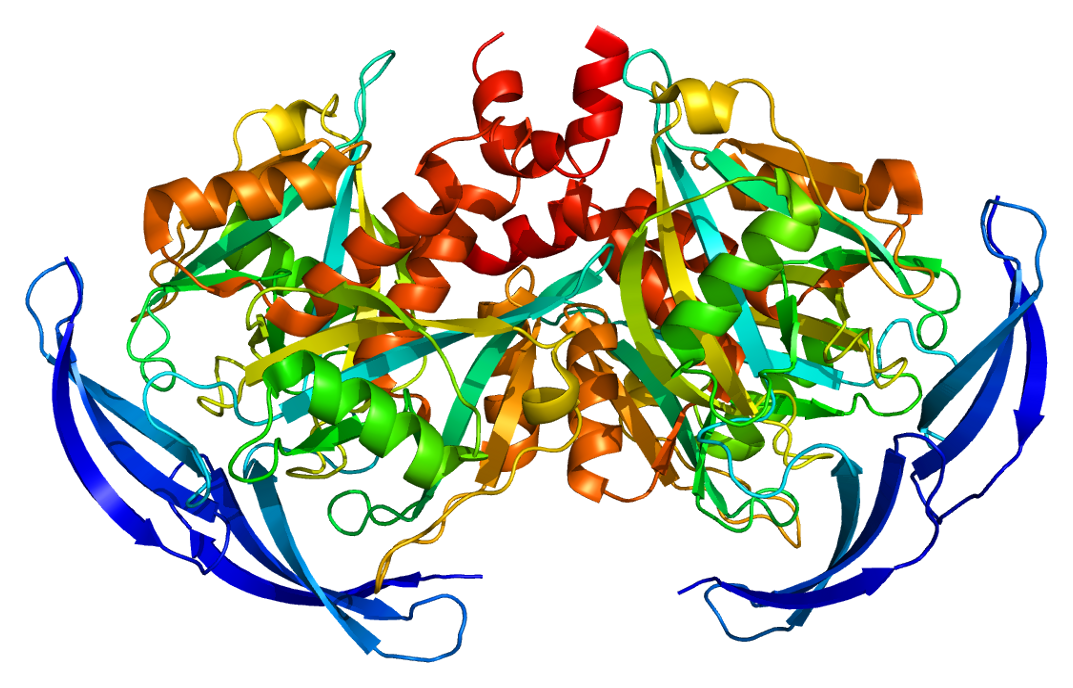
Available structures
PDB	Ortholog search: PDBe RCSB
PDB	List of PDB id codes 2DSB, 2DSC, 2DSD, 3AC9, 3ACA, 3BM4, 3L85

Identifiers
- Aliases: NUDT5, YSA1, YSA1H, YSAH1, hYSAH1, nudix hydrolase 5, hNUDT5
- External IDs: OMIM: 609230; MGI: 1858232; HomoloGene: 5388; GeneCards: NUDT5; OMA:NUDT5 - orthologs
- EC number: 3.6.1.58

Gene location (Human)
Chr.	Chromosome 10 (human)
Band	10p14	Start	12,165,330 bp
Band	10p14	End	12,196,144 bp

Gene location (Mouse)
Chr.	Chromosome 2 (mouse)
Band	2|2 A1	Start	5,845,019 bp
Band	2|2 A1	End	5,871,895 bp
RNA expression pattern
Bgee	Human / Mouse (ortholog); Top expressed in: gonad; right lobe of liver; ganglionic eminence; rectum; stromal cell of endometrium; gingival epithelium; islet of Langerhans; mucosa of ileum; ventricular zone; anterior pituitary / Top expressed in: otic placode; gastrula; embryo; epiblast; embryo; primary oocyte; primitive streak; abdominal wall; medullary collecting duct; ventricular zone; More reference expression data
BioGPS	n/a
Gene ontology
Molecular function	m7G(5')pppN diphosphatase activity; hydrolase activity; magnesium ion binding; metal ion binding; nucleoside-diphosphatase activity; RNA binding; ADP-sugar diphosphatase activity; snoRNA binding; 8-oxo-dGDP phosphatase activity; protein binding; transferase activity; ADP-ribose diphosphatase activity; protein homodimerization activity; nucleotidyltransferase activity
Cellular component	cytosol; extracellular exosome; intracellular anatomical structure; nucleus
Biological process	nucleobase-containing small molecule catabolic process; ribonucleoside diphosphate catabolic process; nucleobase-containing compound metabolic process; nucleotide metabolic process; D-ribose catabolic process; chromatin remodeling; ATP generation from poly-ADP-D-ribose; nucleoside phosphate metabolic process; ribose phosphate metabolic process
Sources:Amigo / QuickGO
Orthologs
Species	Human	Mouse
Entrez	11164	53893
Ensembl	ENSG00000165609	ENSMUSG00000025817
UniProt	Q9UKK9	Q9JKX6
RefSeq (mRNA)	NM_014142; NM_001321647; NM_001321648	NM_016918
RefSeq (protein)	NP_001308576; NP_001308577; NP_054861	NP_058614
Location (UCSC)	Chr 10: 12.17 – 12.2 Mb	Chr 2: 5.85 – 5.87 Mb
PubMed search
- Wikidata
View/Edit Human	View/Edit Mouse

ADP-sugar pyrophosphatase is an enzyme that in humans is encoded by the NUDT5 gene.

Nudix hydrolases, such as NUDT5, eliminate toxic nucleotide derivatives from the cell and regulate the levels of important signaling nucleotides and their metabolites (McLennan, 1999).[supplied by OMIM]
