= Extension Poly(A) Test =

The extension Poly(A) Test (ePAT) describes a method to determine the poly(A) tail lengths of mRNA molecules. It was developed and described by A. Jänicke et al. in 2012.

The method consists of three separate steps: in the first step, the poly-adenylated RNA is hybridised to a DNA oligonucleotide featuring a poly-deoxythymidine sequence at its 5’ end. Klenow polymerase then catalyses elongation of the mRNA’s 3’ end, using the DNA oligonucleotide as a template. This reaction takes place at 25 °C. In the second step, reverse transcriptase synthesis extends the DNA oligonucleotides that have annealed to the mRNA’s extended 3’ end. In order to ensure that DNA oligomers hybridised to internal poly(A) sequences do not serve as primers for reverse transcription, the second step is carried out at 55 °C. A third and final step involves amplification of the newly synthesised cDNA via PCR. This PCR requires one gene-specific and one universal primer. Analysis of the amplicons’ lengths allows for estimation of the sequence flanked by the two primers, i.e. the poly(A) tail length of the sample mRNA.

According to the authors, measurement of poly(A) tail lengths and their distribution amongst different transcripts, this method can be used to determine the cell’s translation state instead of the more tedious analysis of protein translation states.
