= ADP-ribose diphosphatase =

Enzyme

Identifiers
- EC no.: 3.6.1.13
- CAS no.: 9024-83-3

Databases
- IntEnz: IntEnz view
- BRENDA: BRENDA entry
- ExPASy: NiceZyme view
- KEGG: KEGG entry
- MetaCyc: metabolic pathway
- PRIAM: profile
- PDB structures: RCSB PDB PDBe PDBsum
- Gene Ontology: AmiGO / QuickGO
Search
- PMC: articles
- PubMed: articles
- NCBI: proteins

ADP-ribose diphosphatase (EC 3.6.1.13) is an enzyme that catalyzes a hydrolysis reaction in which water nucleophilically attacks ADP-ribose to produce AMP and D-ribose 5-phosphate. Enzyme hydrolysis occurs by the breakage of a phosphoanhydride bond and is dependent on Mg^{2+} ions that are held in complex by the enzyme.

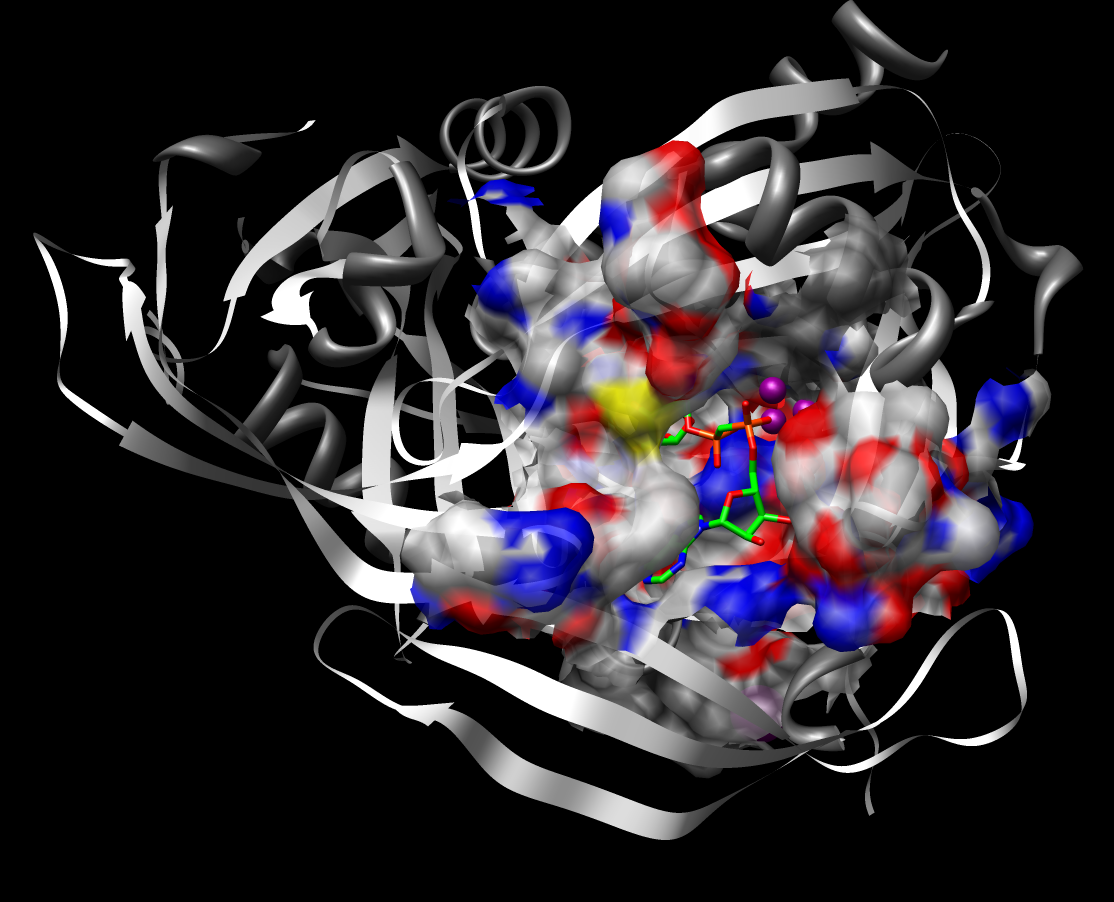
This shows the full enzyme with ADP-Ribose bound in the active site pocket. Blue and red areas on the surface represent polar residues that assist in the creation of the active site pocket. From PDB: 1KHZ.

The C-terminal domain of ADP-ribose diphosphatase contains the Nudix sequence, a highly conserved amino acid sequence that is found in over 450 putative proteins in about 90 different species. A part of this sequence known as the Nudix fold is the catalytic part of the sequence. It is a structurally conserved loop-helix-loop motif that creates a scaffold for metal binding and pyrophosphatase chemistry in the enzyme.

ADP-ribose hydrolases in general act as protective agents against excessive intracellular accumulation of ADP-ribose, as high intracellular levels of ADP-ribose can be damaging to the cell. ADP-ribose diphosphatase, in particular, hydrolyzes ADP-ribose into AMP and D-ribose 5-phosphate, both of which are intermediates of central metabolic pathways and therefore are easily reused.

Other common names for ADP-ribose diphosphatase include ADP-ribose pyrophosphatase and ADPRase. ADP-ribose is commonly referred to as ADPR.

== Structure ==
This shows how H-bonds and Mg^{2+} coordinate and hold the AMPCPR substrate (an analog of ADP-ribose) in complex with the enzyme. Active site amino acids are shown, as well as two important active site water molecules. From PDB: 1KHZ.

ADPRase is a dimer of two identical monomers, each of which contain 209 amino acids. The two monomers are folded into two distinct structural domains and with two equivalent catalytic sites. The C-terminal domain consists of the Nudix sequence mentioned above and the N-terminal domain is primarily involved in dimer stabilization. As noted earlier, the Nudix fold is the catalytic part of the enzyme, but both domains are involved in the active site and they both help with the attachment and coordination of H_{2}O, Mg^{2+}, and the ADP-ribose substrate.

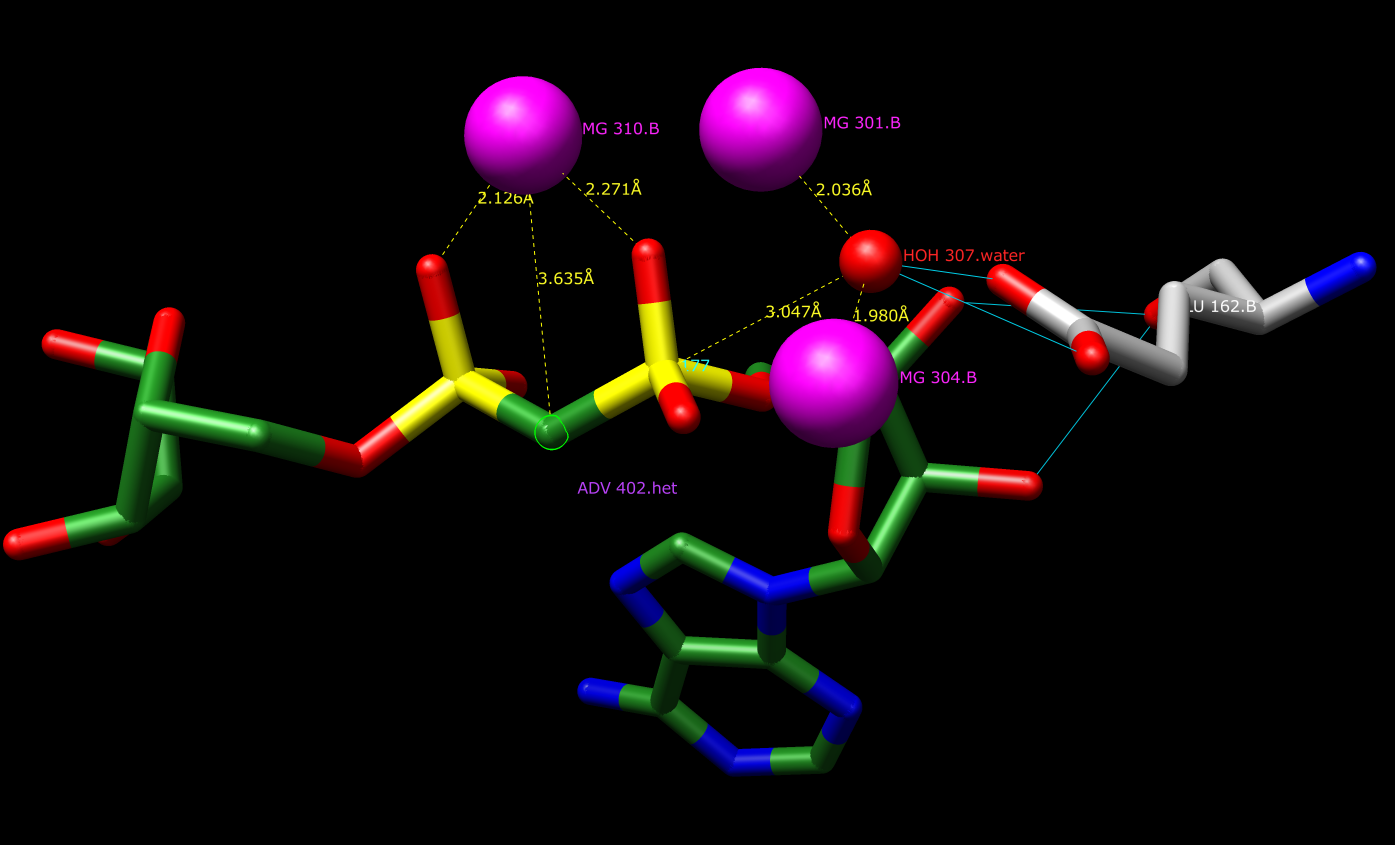
This shows how two Mg^{2+} coordinate the attacking water molecule and how the third Mg^{2+} bridges the two phosphates on ADP-ribose. Distances between the Mg^{2+} and the substrate are shown in angstroms. H-bonds to the catalytic glutamate are also shown. From PDB: 1KHZ.

The adjacent picture shows the active site of ADPRase in complex with AMPCPR and Mg^{2+}. AMPCPR is a nonhydrolyzable analog of ADP-ribose, and thus functions as an inhibitor of ADPRase. The picture below reveals the first and second Mg^{2+} ions, which serve to coordinate the attacking water molecule so that it is perfectly in line with the scissile bond (O-P-O bond is 177 degrees) and poised for attack. A glutamate side chain (E162) will deprotonate the water molecule, and then the hydroxide ion will attack nucleophilically. This occurs when the water molecule is 3.0 angstroms away from the phosphorus molecule it is attacking. By using H_{2}O^{18}, it has been found that the water molecule attacks the adenosyl phosphate. This evidence is a refutation of a previous study that suggested that hydrolysis of ADP-ribose could proceed by nucleophilic attack at either alpha- or beta- phosphate (Gabelli, et al. 2001). After the water molecule attacks, an intermediate is formed, and then ribose 5-phosphate is kicked off as a leaving group. The third active site Mg^{2+} ion is used to stabilize the negative charge of the phosphate group as it leaves, and is thus situated perfectly between the two phosphates.

When the substrate is bound, the structure of the enzyme differs in shape. With the substrate bound, Loop L9 moves 10 angstroms from its original position in the free enzyme, which forms a tighter turn and brings E162 to its catalytic position, meaning this enzyme cycles between an open (free enzyme) and a closed (substrate-metal complex) conformation. This is important because it prevents nonspecific hydrolysis of other nucleotides. ADPRase is highly specific for ADPR, as it has been shown that its K_{m} for ADPR is lower by at least two orders of magnitude than for other sugar nucleotides.

== Mechanism ==
The hydrolysis of ADPR is catalyzed by E162, which improves the nucleophilicity of the water molecule in the active site by deprotonating it. This water is held perfectly in line with the scissile bond by the first and second magnesium ions. The hydroxide ion then attacks the phosphorus atom on the adenosyl phosphate, creating a trigonal bypyramidal intermediate with a negatively charged oxygen attached to the adenosyl phosphate. The double bond is then reformed, effectively discharging ribose 5-phosphate as a leaving group. The third Mg^{2+} is used to stabilize the negative charge on the leaving group.

== Enzyme functions ==
ADP-ribose is an intermediate that is produced during the metabolism of NAD+, mono- or poly-unsaturated proteins, and cyclic-ADP ribose. ADP-ribose is a protein-glycating agent, and excess levels of ADP-ribose in the cell can cause non-enzymatic ADP-ribosylation. Non-enzymatic ADP-ribosylation can inactivate protein targets that contain nucleotide-binding sites when the adenylate moiety of ADP-ribose binds to them, and it can also interfere with metabolic regulation that occurs via enzymatic ADP-ribosylation. For example, actin polymerization is inhibited by non-enzymatic ADP-ribosylation at a Cys residue. Thus, it is believed that ADPRase functions in general as a house-cleaning enzyme to eliminate potentially deleterious ADP-ribose from the cell.

In the literature, the detoxifying role of ADPRase is directly supported in E. coli cells. But in mammalian cells, there is only an indirect evidence linking ADPRase to a detoxifying role, and this comes from studies of the very specific rat liver ADPRibase-I by cytotoxic agents.
