= NUDT16 =

Protein-coding gene found in humans

Identifiers
- Aliases: NUDT16, nudix hydrolase 16
- External IDs: OMIM: 617381; MGI: 1922936; GeneCards: NUDT16
Available structures
PDB	Ortholog search: PDBe RCSB
PDB	List of PDB id codes 2XSQ, 3COU, 3MGM
Enzyme activity
EC #	BRENDA	ExPASy	KEGG	MetaCyc
3.6.1.62	↗	↗	↗	↗
3.6.1.64	↗	↗	↗	↗

Gene location (Human)
Chr.	Chromosome 3 (human)
Band	3q22.1	Start	131,381,671 bp
Band	3q22.1	End	131,388,830 bp

Gene location (Mouse)
Chr.	Chromosome 9 (mouse)
Band	9|9 F1	Start	105,006,102 bp
Band	9|9 F1	End	105,009,023 bp
RNA expression pattern
Bgee	Human / Mouse (ortholog); Top expressed in: tendon of biceps brachii; C1 segment; myocardium of left ventricle; monocyte; internal globus pallidus; amygdala; hypothalamus; tibial nerve; apex of heart; gastric mucosa / Top expressed in: vestibular membrane of cochlear duct; substantia nigra; Paneth cell; granulocyte; Rostral migratory stream; blood; thymus; ileum; facial motor nucleus; supraoptic nucleus; More reference expression data
BioGPS	n/a
Gene ontology
Molecular function	cobalt ion binding; nucleotide binding; dIDP diphosphatase activity; m7G(5')pppN diphosphatase activity; manganese ion binding; protein homodimerization activity; XTP binding; GTP binding; metal ion binding; ITP binding; RNA binding; identical protein binding; metalloexopeptidase activity; hydrolase activity; mRNA binding; magnesium ion binding; snoRNA binding; inosine-diphosphatase activity; dITP diphosphatase activity; chloride ion binding; phosphodiesterase decapping endonuclease activity
Cellular component	cytoplasm; nucleoplasm; nucleolus; nucleus
Biological process	positive regulation of double-strand break repair; nucleobase-containing small molecule catabolic process; IDP catabolic process; nucleotide metabolic process; sno(s)RNA catabolic process; negative regulation of rRNA processing; positive regulation of cell cycle process; positive regulation of cell population proliferation; adenosine to inosine editing; dephosphorylation; proteolysis; mRNA catabolic process; dITP catabolic process; RNA phosphodiester bond hydrolysis, endonucleolytic
Sources:Amigo / QuickGO
Orthologs
Databases	NCBI: entry; OMA: entry
Species	Human	Mouse
Entrez	131870	75686
Ensembl	ENSG00000198585	ENSMUSG00000032565
UniProt	Q96DE0	Q6P3D0
RefSeq (mRNA)	NM_001171905; NM_001171906; NM_152395	NM_029385
RefSeq (protein)	NP_001165376; NP_001165377; NP_689608	NP_083661
Location (UCSC)	Chr 3: 131.38 – 131.39 Mb	Chr 9: 105.01 – 105.01 Mb
PubMed search
- Wikidata
View/Edit Human	View/Edit Mouse

U8 snoRNA-decapping enzyme, also called nudix hydrolase 16, is an enzyme that in humans is encoded by the NUDT16 gene. This enzyme can function as a M7GpppN-mRNA hydrolase (EC 3.6.1.62) and is the only reported inosine diphosphate phosphatase (EC 3.6.1.64) in humans.

== Function ==
Has several functions, including RNA binding activity; metal ion binding activity; and pyrophosphatase activity. Involved in RNA metabolic process and positive regulation of cell cycle process. Located in cytoplasm; nucleolus; and nucleoplasm.

=== Inosine diphosphate phosphatase ===
As a Inosine diphosphate phosphatase (EC 3.6.1.64), this enzyme can hydrolyzes IDP (and dIDP) as part of the following reaction:

(d)IDP + H_{2}O = (d)IMP + phosphate + H^{+}

The human enzyme is also able to hydrolyze similar molecules, especially GDP and dGDP.
