= EDC3 =

Protein-coding gene in the species Homo sapiens

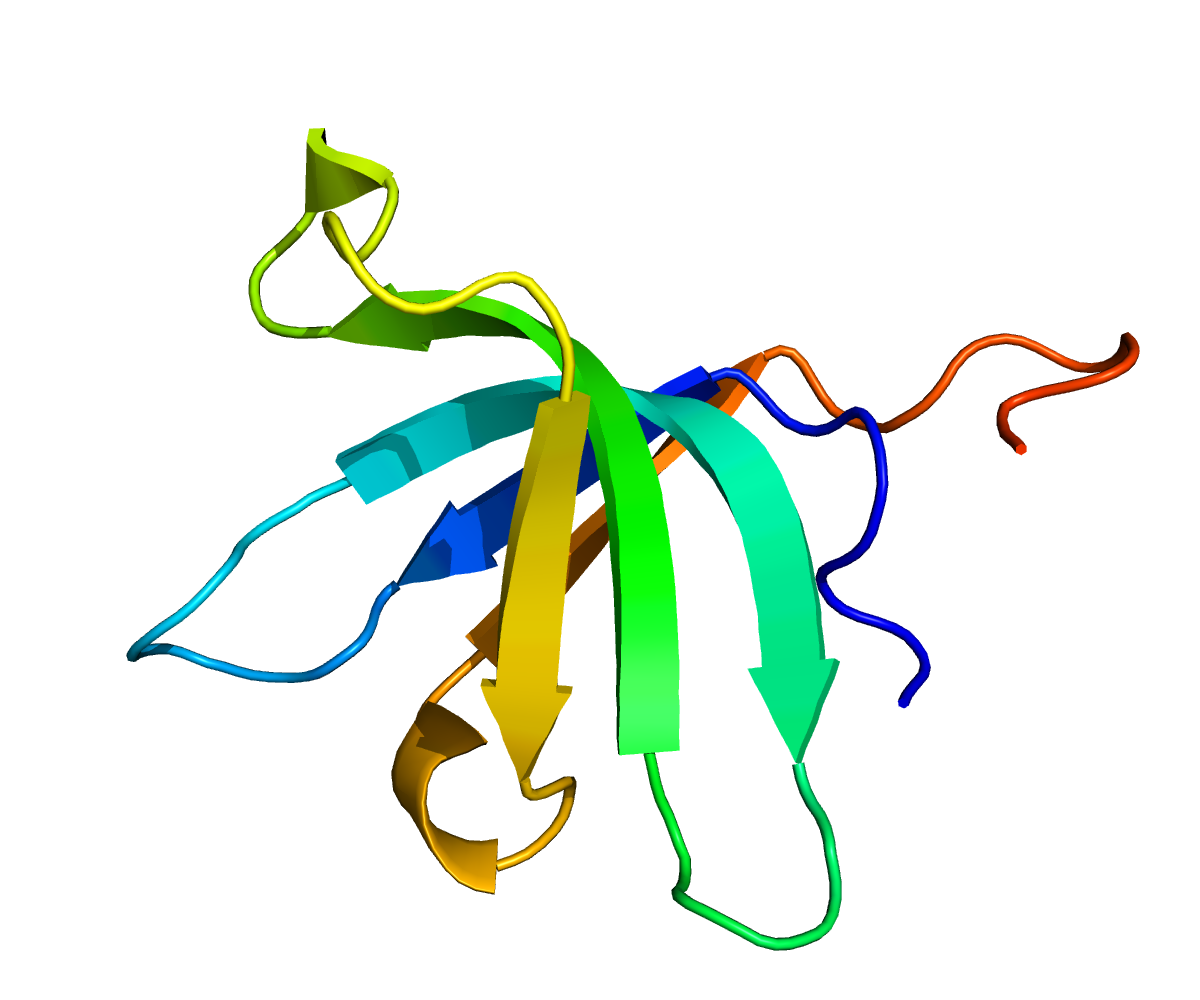
Available structures
PDB	Ortholog search: PDBe RCSB
PDB	List of PDB id codes 2VC8, 2WAX, 2WAY, 3D3J, 3D3K

Identifiers
- Aliases: EDC3, LSM16, YJDC, YJEFN2, MRT50, enhancer of mRNA decapping 3, hYjeF_N2-15q23
- External IDs: OMIM: 609842; MGI: 2142951; HomoloGene: 11827; GeneCards: EDC3; OMA:EDC3 - orthologs

Gene location (Human)
Chr.	Chromosome 15 (human)
Band	15q24.1	Start	74,630,558 bp
Band	15q24.1	End	74,696,292 bp

Gene location (Mouse)
Chr.	Chromosome 9 (mouse)
Band	9|9 B	Start	57,615,823 bp
Band	9|9 B	End	57,659,782 bp
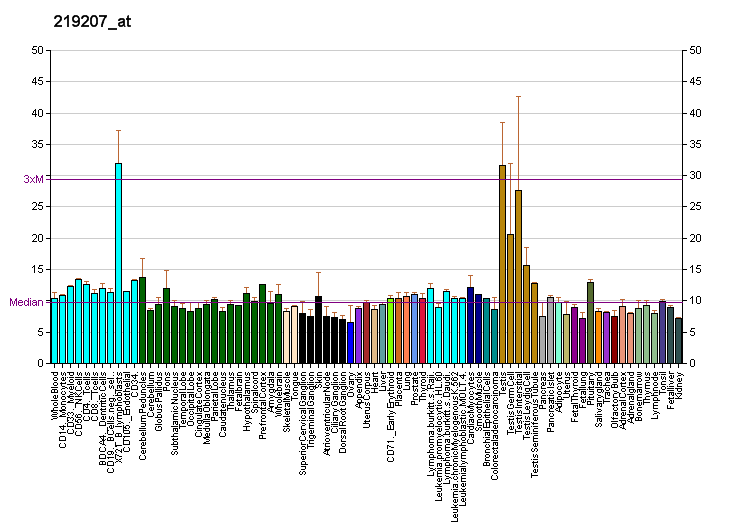
RNA expression pattern
Bgee	Human / Mouse (ortholog); Top expressed in: left testis; right testis; stromal cell of endometrium; ganglionic eminence; ventricular zone; testicle; islet of Langerhans; gonad; granulocyte; right lobe of thyroid gland / Top expressed in: primitive streak; hand; otolith organ; yolk sac; Rostral migratory stream; utricle; otic vesicle; external carotid artery; trigeminal ganglion; internal carotid artery; More reference expression data
BioGPS	More reference expression data
Gene ontology
Molecular function	protein binding; phosphodiesterase decapping endonuclease activity; identical protein binding; RNA binding; mRNA binding
Cellular component	cytoplasm; cytosol; membrane; P-body; cytoplasmic ribonucleoprotein granule
Biological process	P-body assembly; exonucleolytic catabolism of deadenylated mRNA; RNA phosphodiester bond hydrolysis, endonucleolytic; deadenylation-independent decapping of nuclear-transcribed mRNA
Sources:Amigo / QuickGO
Orthologs
Species	Human	Mouse
Entrez	80153	353190
Ensembl	ENSG00000179151	ENSMUSG00000038957
UniProt	Q96F86	Q8K2D3
RefSeq (mRNA)	NM_001142443; NM_001142444; NM_025083; NM_001351378; NM_001351379	NM_153799
RefSeq (protein)	NP_001135915; NP_001135916; NP_079359; NP_001338307; NP_001338308	NP_722494
Location (UCSC)	Chr 15: 74.63 – 74.7 Mb	Chr 9: 57.62 – 57.66 Mb
PubMed search
- Wikidata
View/Edit Human	View/Edit Mouse

Enhancer of mRNA-decapping protein 3 is a protein that in humans is encoded by the EDC3 gene.

EDC3 is associated with an mRNA-decapping complex required for removal of the 5-prime cap from mRNA prior to its degradation from the 5-prime end (Fenger-Gron et al., 2005).[supplied by OMIM]
