= PNRC2 =

Protein-coding gene in humans

Identifiers
- Aliases: PNRC2, proline rich nuclear receptor coactivator 2
- External IDs: OMIM: 611882; MGI: 106512; GeneCards: PNRC2
Available structures
PDB	Ortholog search: PDBe RCSB
PDB	List of PDB id codes 4B6H

Gene location (Human)
Chr.	Chromosome 1 (human)
Band	1p36.11	Start	23,956,839 bp
Band	1p36.11	End	23,963,462 bp

Gene location (Mouse)
Chr.	Chromosome 4 (mouse)
Band	4 D3|4 68.01 cM	Start	135,598,229 bp
Band	4 D3|4 68.01 cM	End	135,601,161 bp
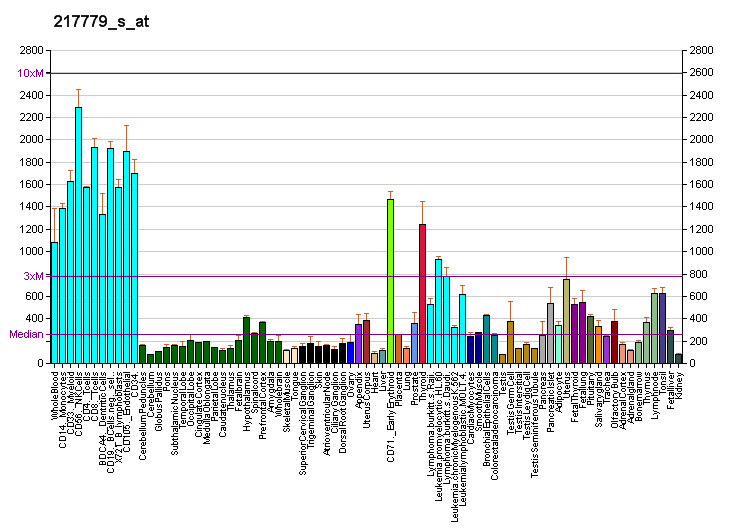
RNA expression pattern
Bgee	Human / Mouse (ortholog); Top expressed in: germinal epithelium; mucosa of sigmoid colon; parietal pleura; trabecular bone; tail of epididymis; visceral pleura; lactiferous duct; lower lobe of lung; epithelium of nasopharynx; mucosa of urinary bladder / Top expressed in: parotid gland; external carotid artery; seminal vesicula; medial ganglionic eminence; internal carotid artery; pituitary gland; molar; atrium; Paneth cell; cumulus cell; More reference expression data
BioGPS	More reference expression data
Gene ontology
Molecular function	protein binding
Cellular component	P-body; nucleus; cytoplasm; nucleoplasm; Golgi apparatus; cytosol
Biological process	regulation of transcription, DNA-templated; deadenylation-independent decapping of nuclear-transcribed mRNA; transcription, DNA-templated; nuclear-transcribed mRNA catabolic process, nonsense-mediated decay
Sources:Amigo / QuickGO
Orthologs
Databases	NCBI: entry; OMA: entry
Species	Human	Mouse
Entrez	55629	52830
Ensembl	ENSG00000189266	ENSMUSG00000028675
UniProt	Q9NPJ4	Q9CR73
RefSeq (mRNA)	NM_017761	NM_026383
RefSeq (protein)	NP_060231	NP_080659
Location (UCSC)	Chr 1: 23.96 – 23.96 Mb	Chr 4: 135.6 – 135.6 Mb
PubMed search
- Wikidata
View/Edit Human	View/Edit Mouse

Proline-rich nuclear receptor coactivator 2 is a protein that in humans is encoded by the PNRC2 gene.
