= DCP1A =

Protein found in humans

Identifiers
- Aliases: DCP1A, HSA275986, Nbla00360, SMAD4IP1, SMIF, decapping mRNA 1A
- External IDs: OMIM: 607010; MGI: 1923151; GeneCards: DCP1A
Available structures
PDB	Ortholog search: PDBe RCSB
PDB	List of PDB id codes 2WX3, 4B6H
Enzyme activity
EC #	BRENDA	ExPASy	KEGG	MetaCyc
3.6.1.62	↗	↗	↗	↗

Gene location (Human)
Chr.	Chromosome 3 (human)
Band	3p21.1	Start	53,283,429 bp
Band	3p21.1	End	53,347,586 bp

Gene location (Mouse)
Chr.	Chromosome 14 (mouse)
Band	14 B|14 18.75 cM	Start	30,201,492 bp
Band	14 B|14 18.75 cM	End	30,249,020 bp
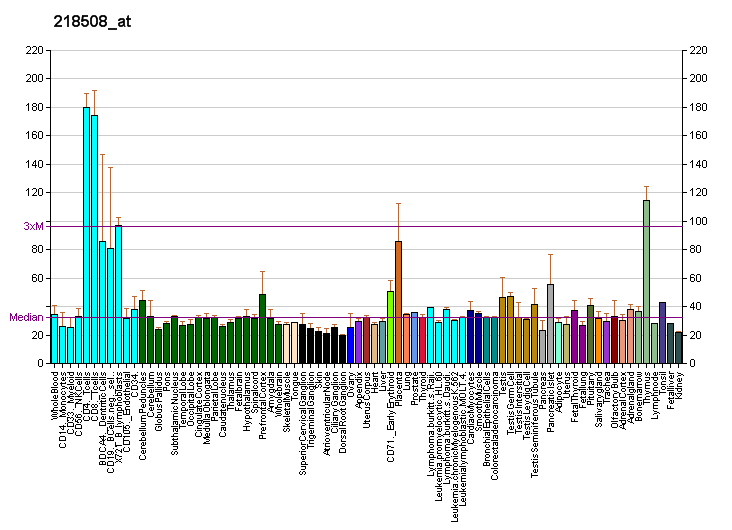
RNA expression pattern
Bgee	Human / Mouse (ortholog); Top expressed in: oocyte; secondary oocyte; cartilage tissue; testicle; Achilles tendon; gonad; sural nerve; tibialis anterior muscle; buccal mucosa cell; islet of Langerhans / Top expressed in: secondary oocyte; zygote; primary oocyte; medullary collecting duct; tail of embryo; saccule; otic vesicle; genital tubercle; otic placode; cumulus cell; More reference expression data
BioGPS	More reference expression data
Gene ontology
Molecular function	enzyme regulator activity; enzyme activator activity; protein binding; mRNA binding; hydrolase activity; identical protein binding; kinesin binding
Cellular component	cytoplasm; cytosol; membrane; nucleus; P-body; cytoplasmic ribonucleoprotein granule
Biological process	positive regulation of catalytic activity; deadenylation-independent decapping of nuclear-transcribed mRNA; protein localization to cytoplasmic stress granule; regulation of mRNA stability; deadenylation-dependent decapping of nuclear-transcribed mRNA; exonucleolytic catabolism of deadenylated mRNA; nuclear-transcribed mRNA catabolic process, nonsense-mediated decay
Sources:Amigo / QuickGO
Orthologs
Databases	NCBI: entry; OMA: entry
Species	Human	Mouse
Entrez	55802	75901
Ensembl	ENSG00000272886	ENSMUSG00000021962
UniProt	Q9NPI6	Q91YD3
RefSeq (mRNA)	NM_018403; NM_001290204; NM_001290205; NM_001290206; NM_001290207	NM_133761
RefSeq (protein)	NP_001277133; NP_001277134; NP_001277135; NP_001277136; NP_060873	NP_598522
Location (UCSC)	Chr 3: 53.28 – 53.35 Mb	Chr 14: 30.2 – 30.25 Mb
PubMed search
- Wikidata
View/Edit Human	View/Edit Mouse

mRNA-decapping enzyme 1A is a protein that in humans is encoded by the DCP1A gene.

Decapping is a key step in general and regulated mRNA decay. The protein encoded by this gene is a decapping enzyme. This protein and another decapping enzyme form a decapping complex, which interacts with the nonsense-mediated decay factor hUpf1 and may be recruited to mRNAs containing premature termination codons. This protein also participates in the TGF-beta signaling pathway.

== Interactions ==
DCP1A has been shown to interact with DCP2 and UPF1. It has also been shown to colocalize with GW182, and other markers of P-body. Human DCP1A is heterotrimeric, and makes contacts with the scaffold EDC3/4. The Arabidopsis thaliana homolog interacts with the plant specific type XI myosin motor protein.
