= KIAA0232 =

Identifiers
- Aliases: KIAA0232
- External IDs: MGI: 1261849; GeneCards: KIAA0232

Gene location (Human)
| Chr. | Chromosome 4 (human) |
| Band | 4p16.1 | Start | 6,781,375 bp |
| Band | 4p16.1 | End | 6,884,170 bp |

Gene location (Mouse)
| Chr. | Chromosome 5 (mouse) |
| Band | 5 B3|5 19.18 cM | Start | 36,600,485 bp |
| Band | 5 B3|5 19.18 cM | End | 36,696,024 bp |
RNA expression pattern
| Bgee | Human / Mouse (ortholog); Top expressed in: Brodmann area 23; middle temporal gyrus; lateral nuclear group of thalamus; Skeletal muscle tissue of rectus abdominis; biceps brachii; Epithelium of choroid plexus; Skeletal muscle tissue of biceps brachii; endothelial cell; internal globus pallidus; amniotic fluid / Top expressed in: lobe of cerebellum; ciliary body; digastric muscle; cerebellar vermis; retinal pigment epithelium; temporal muscle; soleus muscle; triceps brachii muscle; gastrocnemius muscle; hand; More reference expression data |
| BioGPS | n/a |
Orthologs
| Databases | NCBI: entry; OMA: entry |
| Species | Human | Mouse |
| Entrez | 9778 | 320661 |
| Ensembl | ENSG00000170871 | ENSMUSG00000029190 |
| UniProt | Q92628 | Q80U59 |
| RefSeq (mRNA) | NM_001100590; NM_014743 | NM_001081232; NM_177221 |
| RefSeq (protein) | NP_001094060; NP_055558 | NP_001074701 |
| Location (UCSC) | Chr 4: 6.78 – 6.88 Mb | Chr 5: 36.6 – 36.7 Mb |
| PubMed search |
- Wikidata
| View/Edit Human | View/Edit Mouse |

KIAA0232 is a nuclear phosphoserine protein which in humans is encoded by the KIAA0232 gene.

== Gene ==
KIAA0232 is located at 4p16.1 neighboring TBC1 domain family member 14 and an uncharacterized locus. It has 10 exons which comprise its 4 known transcript variants.

Chromosomal neighborhood of gene KIAA0232

=== Expression ===
KIAA0232 is expressed fairly ubiquitously, but particularly highly in the brain relative to other tissues according to GEO normal tissue expression profiling. Other notable areas of high expression identified by EST profiling include nerves, umbilical cord, and parathyroid.

== Homology ==
=== Paralogs ===
There are no known paralogs of KIAA0232.

=== Orthologs ===
KIAA0232 is conserved in most animals, including mammals, reptiles, birds, amphibians, insects, and as far back as Trichnella spiralis, a species of nematode. It is not found in fungi, plants, or prokaryotes.

== Protein ==
The KIAA0232 protein is 1395 amino acids in length with a molecular weight of 154.8kDa. It has higher than average frequencies of serine and glutamic acid residues as well as several multi-serine runs that are evolutionarily conserved. It has an isoelectric point of 4.52.

=== Domains ===
KIAA0232 is largely composed of DUF4603.

Graphic alignment of KIAA0232 and DUF4603 from NCBI BLAST

=== Subcellular localization ===
KIAA0232 is predicted to have nuclear localization.

== Post-translational modification ==
KIAA0232 is predicted by the tools at ExPASy to be highly phosphorylated, with 15 tyrosine specific sites, 25 threonine specific sites, and 103 serine specific sites.

== Interacting proteins ==
KIAA0232 is experimentally known to interact with YWHAZ, DYRK1A, and DYRK1B. via two hybrid interaction experiments. YWHAZ is an apoptotic path regulator known to bind to phosphoserine proteins. DYRK1A/B are dual-specificity tyrosine kinases. This corroborates the post-translational modification predictions.
