= DDX6 =

Protein-coding gene in the species Homo sapiens

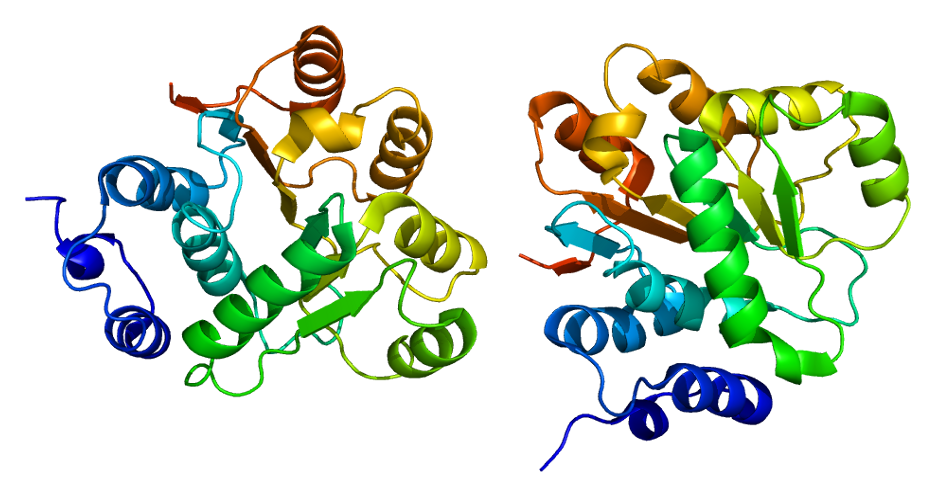

Identifiers
- Aliases: DDX6, HLR2, P54, RCK, DEAD-box helicase 6, IDDILF, Rck/p54
- External IDs: OMIM: 600326; MGI: 104976; GeneCards: DDX6
Available structures
PDB	Ortholog search: PDBe RCSB
PDB	List of PDB id codes 1VEC, 2WAX, 2WAY, 4CRW, 4CT4, 4CT5, 5ANR
Enzyme activity
EC #	BRENDA	ExPASy	KEGG	MetaCyc
3.6.4.13	↗	↗	↗	↗

Gene location (Human)
Chr.	Chromosome 11 (human)
Band	11q23.3	Start	118,747,763 bp
Band	11q23.3	End	118,791,164 bp

Gene location (Mouse)
Chr.	Chromosome 9 (mouse)
Band	9 A5.2|9 24.84 cM	Start	44,516,189 bp
Band	9 A5.2|9 24.84 cM	End	44,552,028 bp
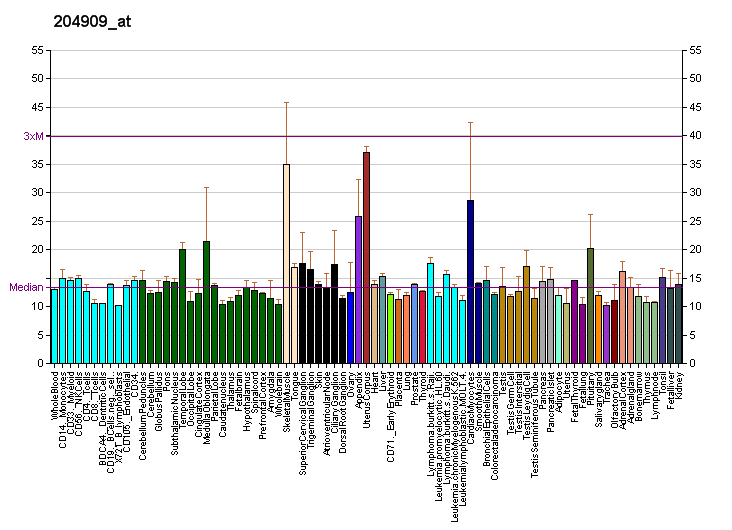
RNA expression pattern
Bgee	Human / Mouse (ortholog); Top expressed in: ganglionic eminence; Achilles tendon; ventricular zone; middle temporal gyrus; superior vestibular nucleus; amniotic fluid; internal globus pallidus; vena cava; lateral nuclear group of thalamus; trigeminal ganglion / Top expressed in: aortic valve; ascending aorta; gastrula; saccule; otic placode; supraoptic nucleus; mesenteric lymph nodes; otic vesicle; lacrimal gland; superior cervical ganglion; More reference expression data
BioGPS	More reference expression data
Gene ontology
Molecular function	RNA helicase activity; nucleotide binding; helicase activity; protein domain specific binding; protein binding; nucleic acid binding; hydrolase activity; ATP binding; RNA binding; cadherin binding
Cellular component	cytoplasm; RISC complex; membrane; P-body; cytoplasmic stress granule; mitochondrion; sperm annulus; P granule; outer dense fiber; heterochromatin; nucleus; cytosol; nucleolus; cytoplasmic ribonucleoprotein granule; chromatoid body; perinuclear region of cytoplasm; concave side of sperm head
Biological process	negative regulation of neuron differentiation; stem cell population maintenance; RNA secondary structure unwinding; P-body assembly; exonucleolytic catabolism of deadenylated mRNA; viral RNA genome packaging; regulation of translation; spermatogenesis; spermatid differentiation
Sources:Amigo / QuickGO
Orthologs
Databases	NCBI: entry; OMA: entry
Species	Human	Mouse
Entrez	1656	13209
Ensembl	ENSG00000110367	ENSMUSG00000032097
UniProt	P26196	P54823
RefSeq (mRNA)	NM_001257191; NM_004397	NM_001110826; NM_007841; NM_181324; NM_001357702; NM_001357703
RefSeq (protein)	NP_001244120; NP_004388	NP_001104296; NP_031867; NP_851841; NP_001344631; NP_001344632
Location (UCSC)	Chr 11: 118.75 – 118.79 Mb	Chr 9: 44.52 – 44.55 Mb
PubMed search
- Wikidata
View/Edit Human	View/Edit Mouse

Probable ATP-dependent RNA helicase DDX6 is an enzyme that in humans is encoded by the DDX6 gene.

DEAD box proteins, characterized by the conserved motif Asp-Glu-Ala-Asp (DEAD), are putative RNA helicases. They are implicated in a number of cellular processes involving alteration of RNA secondary structure, such as translation initiation, nuclear and mitochondrial splicing, and ribosome and spliceosome assembly. Based on their distribution patterns, some members of this family are believed to be involved in embryogenesis, spermatogenesis, and cellular growth and division. This gene encodes a DEAD box protein. It may contribute to the cell proliferation and carcinogenesis.
