= NUDT3 =

Protein-coding gene in the species Homo sapiens

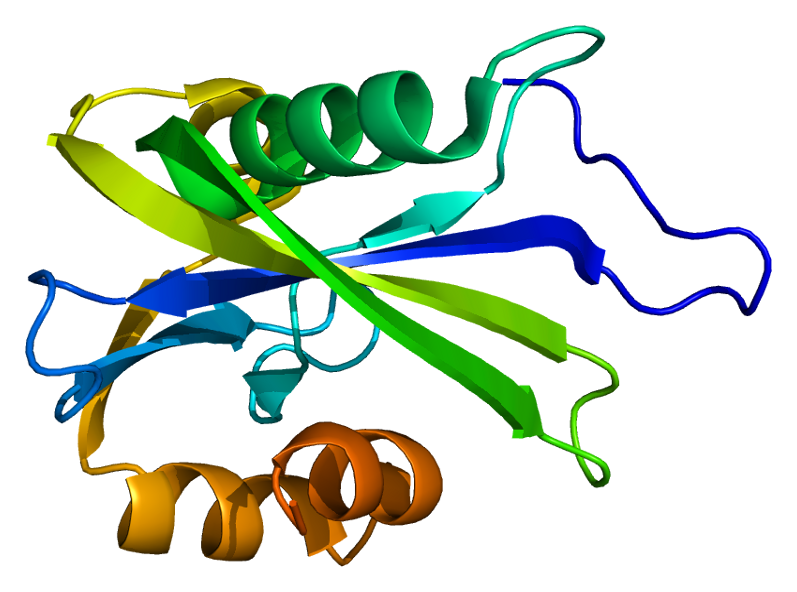
Available structures
PDB	Ortholog search: PDBe RCSB
PDB	List of PDB id codes 2FVV, 2Q9P

Identifiers
- Aliases: NUDT3, DIPP, DIPP-1, DIPP1, nudix hydrolase 3
- External IDs: OMIM: 609228; MGI: 1928484; HomoloGene: 31400; GeneCards: NUDT3; OMA:NUDT3 - orthologs

Gene location (Human)
Chr.	Chromosome 6 (human)
Band	6p21.31	Start	34,279,679 bp
Band	6p21.31	End	34,392,669 bp

Gene location (Mouse)
Chr.	Chromosome 17 (mouse)
Band	17|17 A3.3	Start	27,798,356 bp
Band	17|17 A3.3	End	27,842,469 bp
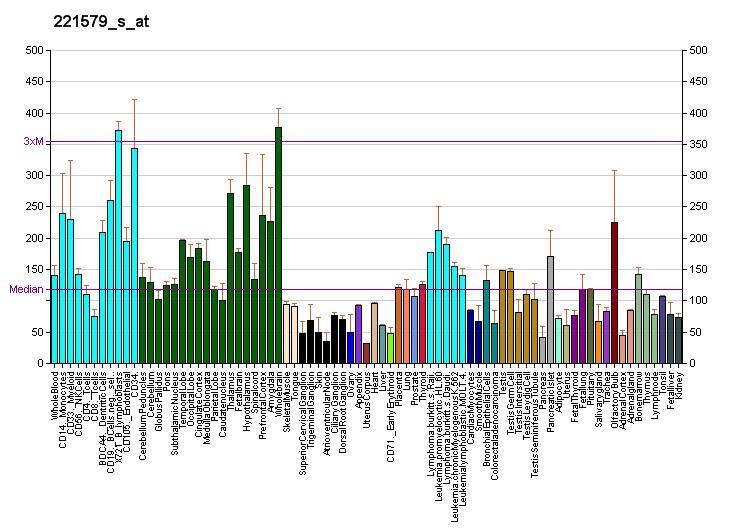
RNA expression pattern
Bgee	Human / Mouse (ortholog); Top expressed in: dorsal motor nucleus of vagus nerve; inferior olivary nucleus; postcentral gyrus; Brodmann area 46; Brodmann area 10; middle frontal gyrus; Region I of hippocampus proper; lateral nuclear group of thalamus; external globus pallidus; entorhinal cortex / Top expressed in: neural layer of retina; perirhinal cortex; entorhinal cortex; CA3 field; dentate gyrus of hippocampal formation granule cell; primary visual cortex; superior frontal gyrus; central gray substance of midbrain; cingulate gyrus; primary motor cortex; More reference expression data
BioGPS	More reference expression data
Gene ontology
Molecular function	inositol-3-diphosphate-1,2,4,5,6-pentakisphosphate diphosphatase activity; inositol diphosphate tetrakisphosphate diphosphatase activity; inositol-3,5-bisdiphosphate-2,3,4,6-tetrakisphosphate 5-diphosphatase activity; hydrolase activity; diphosphoinositol-polyphosphate diphosphatase activity; inositol-5-diphosphate-1,2,3,4,6-pentakisphosphate diphosphatase activity; metal ion binding; inositol-1,5-bisdiphosphate-2,3,4,6-tetrakisphosphate 1-diphosphatase activity; inositol-1,5-bisdiphosphate-2,3,4,6-tetrakisphosphate 5-diphosphatase activity; magnesium ion binding; inositol-1-diphosphate-2,3,4,5,6-pentakisphosphate diphosphatase activity; inositol diphosphate pentakisphosphate diphosphatase activity; inositol bisdiphosphate tetrakisphosphate diphosphatase activity; endopolyphosphatase activity; bis(5'-adenosyl)-hexaphosphatase activity; bis(5'-adenosyl)-pentaphosphatase activity; m7G(5')pppN diphosphatase activity
Cellular component	nucleus; cytoplasm; cytosol
Biological process	cell-cell signaling; diadenosine polyphosphate catabolic process; inositol phosphate metabolic process; diphosphoinositol polyphosphate catabolic process; diadenosine pentaphosphate catabolic process; diadenosine hexaphosphate catabolic process; adenosine 5'-(hexahydrogen pentaphosphate) catabolic process; diphosphoinositol polyphosphate metabolic process
Sources:Amigo / QuickGO
Orthologs
Species	Human	Mouse
Entrez	11165	56409
Ensembl	ENSG00000272325	ENSMUSG00000024213
UniProt	O95989	Q9JI46
RefSeq (mRNA)	NM_006703	NM_001291046; NM_019837
RefSeq (protein)	NP_006694	NP_001277975; NP_062811
Location (UCSC)	Chr 6: 34.28 – 34.39 Mb	Chr 17: 27.8 – 27.84 Mb
PubMed search
- Wikidata
View/Edit Human	View/Edit Mouse

Diphosphoinositol polyphosphate phosphohydrolase 1 is an enzyme that in humans is encoded by the NUDT3 gene.

NUDT3 belongs to the MutT, or Nudix, protein family. Nudix proteins act as homeostatic checkpoints at important stages in nucleoside phosphate metabolic pathways, guarding against elevated levels of potentially dangerous intermediates, like 8-oxo-dGTP, which promotes AT-to-CG transversions (Safrany et al., 1998).[supplied by OMIM]
