= DCP2 =

Protein found in humans

Identifiers
- Aliases: DCP2, NUDT20, decapping mRNA 2
- External IDs: OMIM: 609844; MGI: 1917890; HomoloGene: 13968; GeneCards: DCP2; OMA:DCP2 - orthologs

Gene location (Human)
Chr.	Chromosome 5 (human)
Band	5q22.2	Start	112,976,702 bp
Band	5q22.2	End	113,022,195 bp

Gene location (Mouse)
Chr.	Chromosome 18 (mouse)
Band	18|18 B3	Start	44,513,569 bp
Band	18|18 B3	End	44,558,036 bp
RNA expression pattern
Bgee	Human / Mouse (ortholog); Top expressed in: oocyte; secondary oocyte; trabecular bone; sperm; parietal pleura; placenta; monocyte; bone marrow; visceral pleura; epithelium of nasopharynx / Top expressed in: hand; otolith organ; utricle; primitive streak; superior cervical ganglion; vas deferens; condyle; vestibular membrane of cochlear duct; abdominal wall; trigeminal ganglion; More reference expression data
BioGPS	n/a
Gene ontology
Molecular function	m7G(5')pppN diphosphatase activity; manganese ion binding; metal ion binding; protein binding; exoribonuclease activity, producing 5'-phosphomonoesters; RNA binding; hydrolase activity; 5'-3' exoribonuclease activity; telomerase RNA binding
Cellular component	cytoplasm; RISC complex; cytosol; P-body; nucleoplasm; cell junction; nucleus; cytoplasmic ribonucleoprotein granule
Biological process	mRNA catabolic process; regulation of mRNA stability; deadenylation-dependent decapping of nuclear-transcribed mRNA; exonucleolytic catabolism of deadenylated mRNA; histone mRNA catabolic process; RNA phosphodiester bond hydrolysis, exonucleolytic; nuclear-transcribed mRNA catabolic process, nonsense-mediated decay; negative regulation of telomere maintenance via telomerase; regulation of telomerase RNA localization to Cajal body
Sources:Amigo / QuickGO
Orthologs
Species	Human	Mouse
Entrez	167227	70640
Ensembl	ENSG00000172795	ENSMUSG00000024472
UniProt	Q8IU60	Q9CYC6
RefSeq (mRNA)	NM_001242377; NM_152624	NM_027490
RefSeq (protein)	NP_001229306; NP_689837	NP_081766
Location (UCSC)	Chr 5: 112.98 – 113.02 Mb	Chr 18: 44.51 – 44.56 Mb
PubMed search
- Wikidata
View/Edit Human	View/Edit Mouse

mRNA-decapping enzyme 2 is a protein that in humans is encoded by the DCP2 gene.

DCP2 is a key component of an mRNA-decapping complex required for removal of the 5-prime cap from mRNA prior to its degradation from the 5-prime end (Fenger-Gron et al., 2005).[supplied by OMIM]

== Interactions ==
DCP2 has been shown to interact with DCP1A and UPF1.
