= P-bodies =

Biomolecular condensates of mRNA and RNA binding proteins found in eukaryotic cells

In cellular biology, P-bodies, or processing bodies, are distinct foci formed by phase separation within the cytoplasm of a eukaryotic cell consisting of many enzymes involved in mRNA turnover. P-bodies are highly conserved structures and have been observed in somatic cells originating from vertebrates and invertebrates, plants and yeast. To date, P-bodies have been demonstrated to play fundamental roles in general mRNA decay, nonsense-mediated mRNA decay, adenylate-uridylate-rich element mediated mRNA decay, and microRNA (miRNA) induced mRNA silencing. Not all mRNAs which enter P-bodies are degraded, as it has been demonstrated that some mRNAs can exit P-bodies and re-initiate translation. Purification and sequencing of the mRNA from purified processing bodies showed that these mRNAs are largely translationally repressed upstream of translation initiation and are protected from 5' mRNA decay.

P-bodies were originally proposed to be the sites of mRNA degradation in the cell and involved in decapping and digestion of mRNAs earmarked for destruction. Later work called this into question suggesting P bodies store mRNA until needed for translation.

In neurons, P-bodies are moved by motor proteins in response to stimulation. This is likely tied to local translation in dendrites.

== History ==
P-bodies were first described in the scientific literature by Bashkirov et al. in 1997, in which they describe "small granules… discrete, prominent foci" as the cytoplasmic location of the mouse exoribonuclease mXrn1p. It wasn't until 2002 that a glimpse into the nature and importance of these cytoplasmic foci was published., when researchers demonstrated that multiple proteins involved with mRNA degradation localize to the foci. Their importance was recognized after experimental evidence was obtained pointing to P-bodies as the sites of mRNA degradation in the cell. The researchers named these structures processing bodies or "P bodies". During this time, many descriptive names were used also to identify the processing bodies, including "GW-bodies" and "decapping-bodies"; however "P-bodies" was the term chosen and is now widely used and accepted in the scientific literature. Recently evidence has been presented suggesting that GW-bodies and P-bodies may in fact be different cellular components. The evidence being that GW182 and Ago2, both associated with miRNA gene silencing, are found exclusively in multivesicular bodies or GW-bodies and are not localized to P-bodies. Also of note, P-bodies are not equivalent to stress granules and they contain largely non-overlapping proteins. The two structures support overlapping cellular functions but generally occur under different stimuli. Hoyle et al. suggests a novel site termed EGP bodies, or stress granules, may be responsible for mRNA storage as these sites lack the decapping enzyme.

== Associations with microRNA ==
MicroRNA (miRNA) mediated repression occurs in two ways, either by translational repression or stimulating mRNA decay. miRNA recruit the RISC complex to the mRNA to which they are bound. The link to P-bodies comes by the fact that many, if not most, of the proteins necessary for miRNA gene silencing are localized to P-bodies, as reviewed by Kulkarni et al. (2010). These proteins include, but are not limited to, the scaffold protein GW182, Argonaute (Ago), decapping enzymes and RNA helicases. The current evidence points toward P-bodies as being scaffolding centers of miRNA function, especially due to the evidence that a knock down of GW182 disrupts P-body formation. However, there remain many unanswered questions about P-bodies and their relationship to miRNA activity. Specifically, it is unknown whether there is a context dependent (stress state versus normal) specificity to the P-body's mechanism of action. Based on the evidence that P-bodies sometimes are the site of mRNA decay and sometimes the mRNA can exit the P-bodies and re-initiate translation, the question remains of what controls this switch. Another ambiguous point to be addressed is whether the proteins that localize to P-bodies are actively functioning in the miRNA gene silencing process or whether they are merely on standby.

== Protein composition ==
In 2017, a new method to purify processing bodies was published. Hubstenberger et al. used fluorescence-activated particle sorting (a method based on the ideas of fluorescence-activated cell sorting) to purify processing bodies from human epithelial cells. From these purified processing bodies they were able to use mass spectrometry and RNA sequencing to determine which proteins and RNAs are found in processing bodies, respectively. This study identified 125 proteins that are significantly associated with processing bodies. Notably this work provided the most compelling evidence up to this date that P-bodies might not be the sites of degradation in the cell and instead used for storage of translationally repressed mRNA. This observation was further supported by single molecule imaging of mRNA by the Chao group in 2017.

In 2018, Youn et al. took a proximity labeling approach called BioID to identify and predict the processing body proteome. They engineered cells to express several processing body-localized proteins as fusion proteins with the BirA* enzyme. When the cells are incubated with biotin, BirA* will biotinylate proteins that are nearby, thus tagging the proteins within processing bodies with a biotin tag. Streptavidin was then used to isolate the tagged proteins and mass spectrometry to identify them. Using this approach, Youn et al. identified 42 proteins that localize to processing bodies.

| Gene ID | Protein | References | Also found in stress granules? |
|---|---|---|---|
| MOV10 | MOV10 | | Yes |
| EDC3 | EDC3 | | Yes |
| EDC4 | EDC4 | | Yes |
| ZCCHC11 | TUT4 | | No |
| DHX9 | DHX9 | | No |
| RPS27A | RS27A | | No |
| UPF1 | RENT1 | | Yes |
| ZCCHC3 | ZCHC3 | | No |
| SMARCA5 | SMCA5 | | No |
| TOP2A | TOP2A | | No |
| HSPA2 | HSP72 | | No |
| SPTAN1 | SPTN1 | | No |
| SMC1A | SMC1A | | No |
| ACTBL2 | ACTBL | | Yes |
| SPTBN1 | SPTB2 | | No |
| DHX15 | DHX15 | | No |
| ARG1 | ARGI1 | | No |
| TOP2B | TOP2B | | No |
| APOBEC3F | ABC3F | | No |
| NOP58 | NOP58 | | Yes |
| RPF2 | RPF2 | | No |
| S100A9 | S100A9 | | Yes |
| DDX41 | DDX41 | | No |
| KIF23 | KIF23 | | Yes |
| AZGP1 | ZA2G | | No |
| DDX50 | DDX50 | | Yes |
| SERPINB3 | SPB3 | | No |
| SBSN | SBSN | | No |
| BAZ1B | BAZ1B | | No |
| MYO1C | MYO1C | | No |
| EIF4A3 | IF4A3 | | No |
| SERPINB12 | SPB12 | | No |
| EFTUD2 | U5S1 | | No |
| RBM15B | RB15B | | No |
| AGO2 | AGO2 | | Yes |
| MYH10 | MYH10 | | No |
| DDX10 | DDX10 | | No |
| FABP5 | FABP5 | | No |
| SLC25A5 | ADT2 | | No |
| DMKN | DMKN | | No |
| DCP2 | DCP2 | | No |
| S100A8 | S10A8 | | No |
| NCBP1 | NCBP1 | | No |
| YTHDC2 | YTDC2 | | No |
| NOL6 | NOL6 | | No |
| XAB2 | SYF1 | | No |
| PUF60 | PUF60 | | No |
| RBM19 | RBM19 | | No |
| WDR33 | WDR33 | | No |
| PNRC1 | PNRC1 | | No |
| SLC25A6 | ADT3 | | No |
| MCM7 | MCM7 | | Yes |
| GSDMA | GSDMA | | No |
| HSPB1 | HSPB1 | | Yes |
| LYZ | LYSC | | No |
| DHX30 | DHX30 | | Yes |
| BRIX1 | BRX1 | | No |
| MEX3A | MEX3A | | Yes |
| MSI1 | MSI1H | | Yes |
| RBM25 | RBM25 | | No |
| UTP11L | UTP11 | | No |
| UTP15 | UTP15 | | No |
| SMG7 | SMG7 | | Yes |
| AGO1 | AGO1 | | Yes |
| LGALS7 | LEG7 | | No |
| MYO1D | MYO1D | | No |
| XRCC5 | XRCC5 | | No |
| DDX6 | DDX6/p54/RCK | | Yes |
| ZC3HAV1 | ZCCHV | | Yes |
| DDX27 | DDX27 | | No |
| NUMA1 | NUMA1 | | No |
| DSG1 | DSG1 | | No |
| NOP56 | NOP56 | | No |
| LSM14B | LS14B | | Yes |
| EIF4E2 | EIF4E2 | | Yes |
| EIF4ENIF1 | 4ET | | Yes |
| LSM14A | LS14A | | Yes |
| IGF2BP2 | IF2B2 | | Yes |
| DDX21 | DDX21 | | Yes |
| DSC1 | DSC1 | | No |
| NKRF | NKRF | | No |
| DCP1B | DCP1B | | No |
| SMC3 | SMC3 | | No |
| RPS3 | RS3 | | Yes |
| PUM1 | PUM1 | | Yes |
| PIP | PIP | | No |
| RPL26 | RL26 | | No |
| GTPBP4 | NOG1 | | No |
| PES1 | PESC | | No |
| DCP1A | DCP1A | | No |
| ELAVL2 | ELAV2 | | Yes |
| IGLC2 | LAC2 | | No |
| IGF2BP1 | IF2B1 | | Yes |
| RPS16 | RS16 | | No |
| HNRNPU | HNRPU | | No |
| IGF2BP3 | IF2B3 | | Yes |
| SF3B1 | SF3B1 | | No |
| STAU2 | STAU2 | | Yes |
| ZFR | ZFR | | No |
| HNRNPM | HNRPM | | No |
| ELAVL1 | ELAV1 | | Yes |
| FAM120A | F120A | | Yes |
| STRBP | STRBP | | No |
| RBM15 | RBM15 | | No |
| LMNB2 | LMNB2 | | No |
| NIFK | MK67I | | No |
| TF | TRFE | | No |
| HNRNPR | HNRPR | | No |
| LMNB1 | LMNB1 | | No |
| ILF2 | ILF2 | | No |
| H2AFY | H2AY | | No |
| RBM28 | RBM28 | | No |
| MATR3 | MATR3 | | No |
| SYNCRIP | HNRPQ | | Yes |
| HNRNPCL1 | HNRCL | | No |
| APOA1 | APOA1 | | No |
| XRCC6 | XRCC6 | | No |
| RPS4X | RS4X | | No |
| DDX18 | DDX18 | | No |
| ILF3 | ILF3 | | Yes |
| SAFB2 | SAFB2 | | Yes |
| RBMX | RBMX | | No |
| ATAD3A | ATD3A | | Yes |
| HNRNPC | HNRPC | | No |
| RBMXL1 | RMXL1 | | No |
| IMMT | IMMT | | No |
| ALB | ALBU | | No |
| CSNK1D | CK1𝛿 | | No |
| XRN1 | XRN1 | | Yes |
| TNRC6A | GW182 | | Yes |
| TNRC6B | TNRC6B | | Yes |
| TNRC6C | TNRC6C | | Yes |
| LSM4 | LSM4 | | No |
| LSM1 | LSM1 | | No |
| LSM2 | LSM2 | | No |
| LSM3 | LSM3 | | Yes |
| LSM5 | LSM5 | | No |
| LSM6 | LSM6 | | No |
| LSM7 | LSM7 | | No |
| CNOT1 | CCR4/CNOT1 | | Yes |
| CNOT10 | CNOT10 | | Yes |
| CNOT11 | CNOT11 | | Yes |
| CNOT2 | CNOT2 | | Yes |
| CNOT3 | CNOT3 | | Yes |
| CNOT4 | CNOT4 | | Yes |
| CNOT6 | CNOT6 | | Yes |
| CNOT6L | CNOT6L | | Yes |
| CNOT7 | CNOT7 | | Yes |
| CNOT8 | CNOT8 | | Yes |
| CNOT9 | CNOT9 | | No |
| RBFOX1 | RBFOX1 | | Yes |
| ANKHD1 | ANKHD1 | | Yes |
| ANKRD17 | ANKRD17 | | Yes |
| BTG3 | BTG3 | | Yes |
| CEP192 | CEP192 | | No |
| CPEB4 | CPEB4 | | Yes |
| CPVL | CPVL | | Yes |
| DIS3L | DIS3L | | No |
| DVL3 | DVL3 | | No |
| FAM193A | FAM193A | | No |
| GIGYF2 | GIGYF2 | | Yes |
| HELZ | HELZ | | Yes |
| KIAA0232 | KIAA0232 | | Yes |
| KIAA0355 | KIAA0355 | | No |
| MARF1 | MARF1 | | Yes |
| N4BP2 | N4BP2 | | No |
| PATL1 | PATL1 | | Yes |
| RNF219 | RNF219 | | Yes |
| ST7 | ST7 | | Yes |
| TMEM131 | TMEM131 | | Yes |
| TNKS1BP1 | TNKS1BP1 | | Yes |
| TTC17 | TTC17 | | Yes |
