= Nudix hydrolase =

Superfamily of hydrolytic enzymes

NUDIX
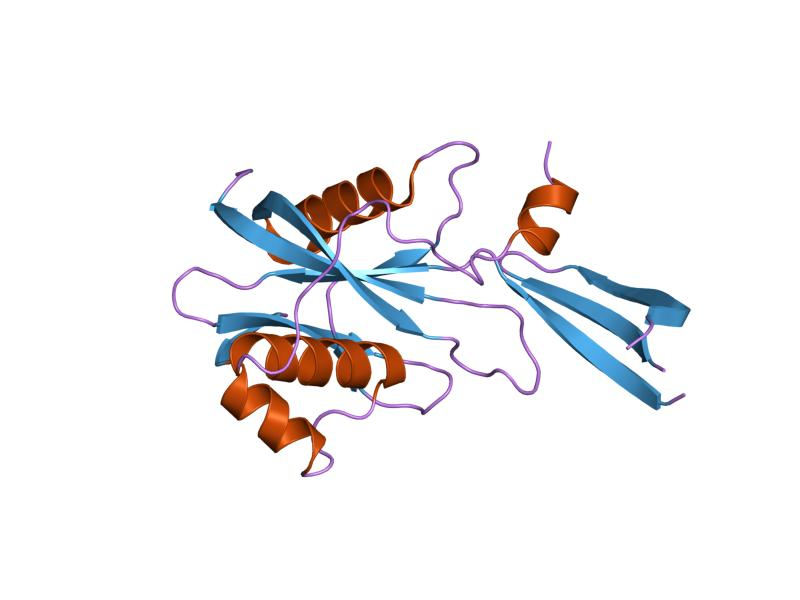
- Structure of MT-ADPRase, a Nudix hydrolase from Mycobacterium tuberculosis

Identifiers
- Symbol: NUDIX
- Pfam: PF00293
- Pfam clan: CL0261
- ECOD: 221.4.1
- InterPro: IPR000086
Available protein structures:
- PDB: IPR000086 PF00293 (ECOD; PDBsum)
- AlphaFold: IPR000086; PF00293

NUDIX-like
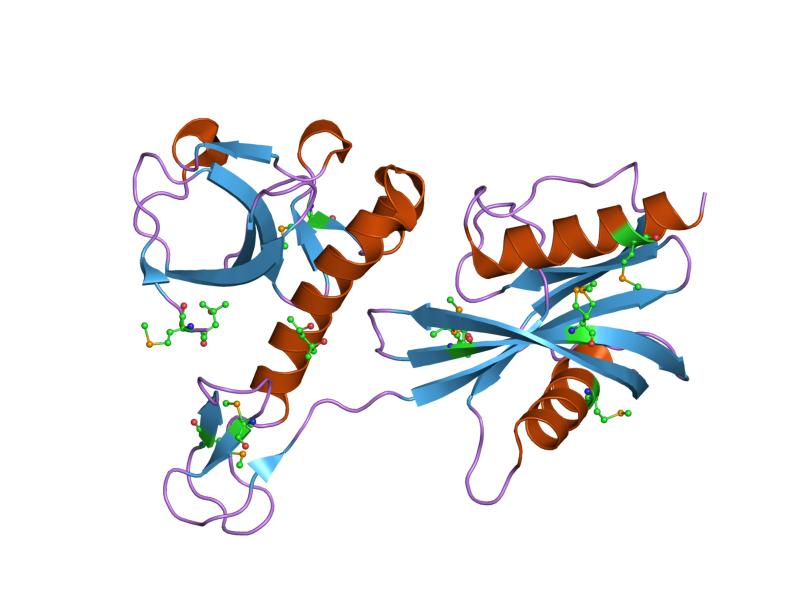
- Crystal structure of NADH pyrophosphatase (1790429) from Escherichia coli k12 at 2.20 a resolution

Identifiers
- Symbol: NUDIX-like
- Pfam: PF09296
- Pfam clan: CL0261
- InterPro: IPR015375
- SCOP2: 1vk6 / SCOPe / SUPFAM
Available protein structures:
- PDB: IPR015375 PF09296 (ECOD; PDBsum)
- AlphaFold: IPR015375; PF09296

NUDIX hydrolases are a superfamily of hydrolytic enzymes capable of cleaving nucleoside diphosphates linked to x (any moiety), hence their name. The reaction yields nucleoside monophosphate (NMP) plus X-P. Substrates hydrolysed by nudix enzymes comprise a wide range of organic pyrophosphates, including nucleoside di- and triphosphates, dinucleoside and diphosphoinositol polyphosphates, nucleotide sugars and RNA caps, with varying degrees of substrate specificity. Enzymes of the NUDIX superfamily are found in all types of organisms, including eukaryotes, bacteria and archaea.

There are two components to the NUDIX family: the so-called NUDIX fold of a beta sheet with alpha helices on each side and the NUDIX motif which contains catalytic and metal-binding amino acids. The Nudix motif is GXXXXXEXXXXXXXREUXEEXGU where U is isoleucine, leucine or valine, and X is any amino acid. This forms a short helix which (usually) contains the catalytic amino acids. NUDIX hydrolases include Dcp2 of the decapping complex, ADP-ribose diphosphatase, MutT, ADPRase, Ap4A hydrolases, RppH, and many others.
