= TREX complex =

Multi-protein complex

The TREX (TRanscription-EXport) complex is a conserved eukaryotic multi-protein complex that couples mRNA transcription and nuclear export. The TREX complex travels across transcribed genes with RNA polymerase II. TREX binds mRNA and recruits transport proteins NXF1 and NXT1 (yeast Mex67 and Mtr2), which shuttle the mRNA out of the nucleus. The TREX complex plays an important role in genome stability and neurodegenerative diseases.

== Role in mRNA nuclear export ==
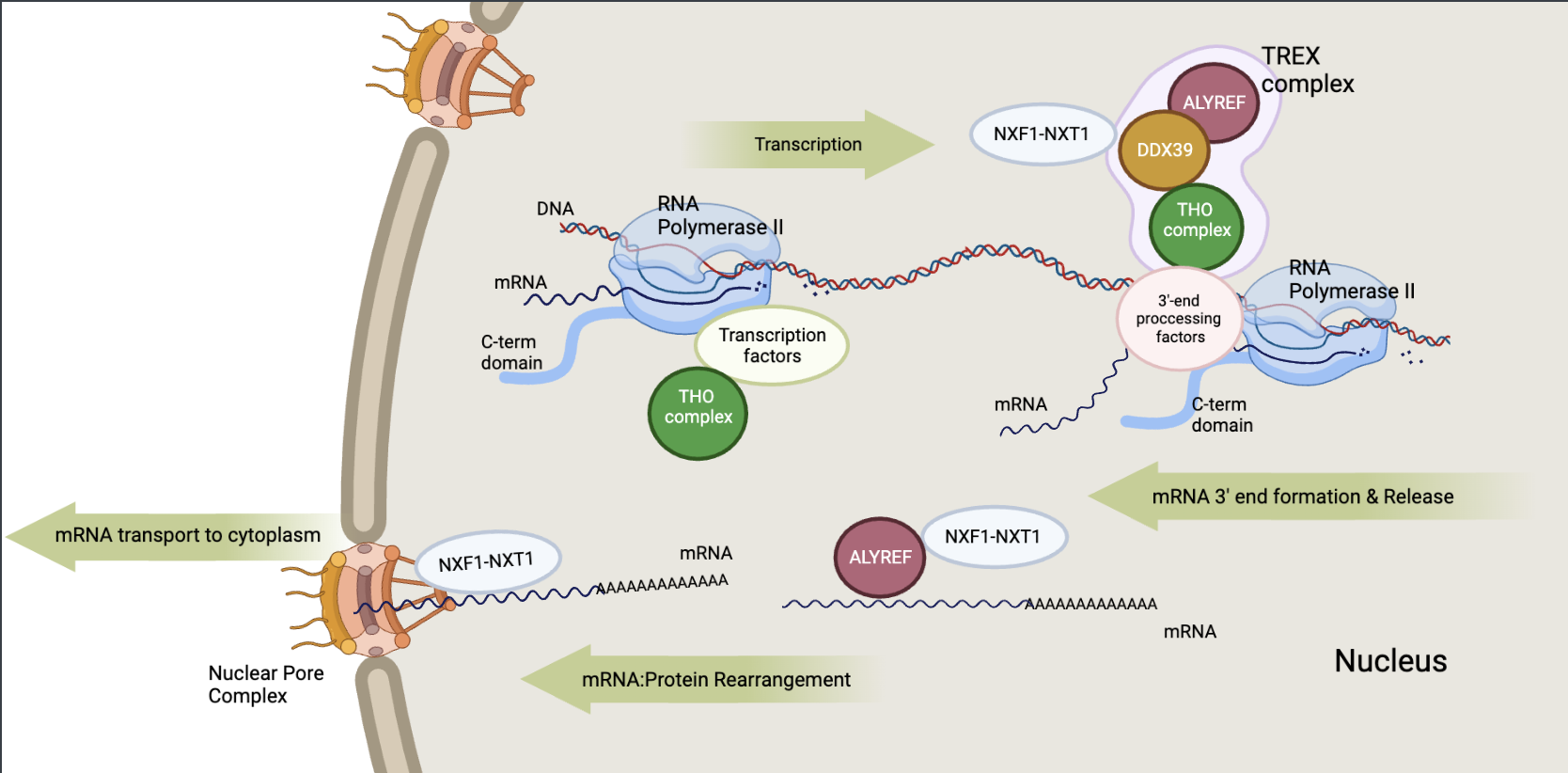
Nuclear export of mRNAs facilitated by TREX complex.

During transcription elongation, the THO complex follows RNA polymerase II and interacts with transcription factors along the entire transcribed region. Then, the carboxy-terminal domain (CTD) of RNA polymerase II recruits the 3'-end processing factors/transcription termination factors, which load DEAD-box RNA helicase UAP56 and RNA export adapter ALYREF. This forms the complete TREX complex. At the end of transcription, after the 3'-end of mRNA is formed and the mRNA is released from transcription site, the mRNA is transferred from UAP56 to ALYREF. UAP56 then dissociates, allowing the heterodimeric export receptor NXF1-NXT1 to bind as it recognizes the mRNA indirectly through ALYREF. Further arrangements of mRNA result in ALYREF's release. Finally, the NXF1-NXT1 dimer facilitates mRNA nuclear transport to the cytoplasm through direct interaction with the nuclear pore complex.

== Composition and conservation in eukaryotic species ==
=== THO complex ===
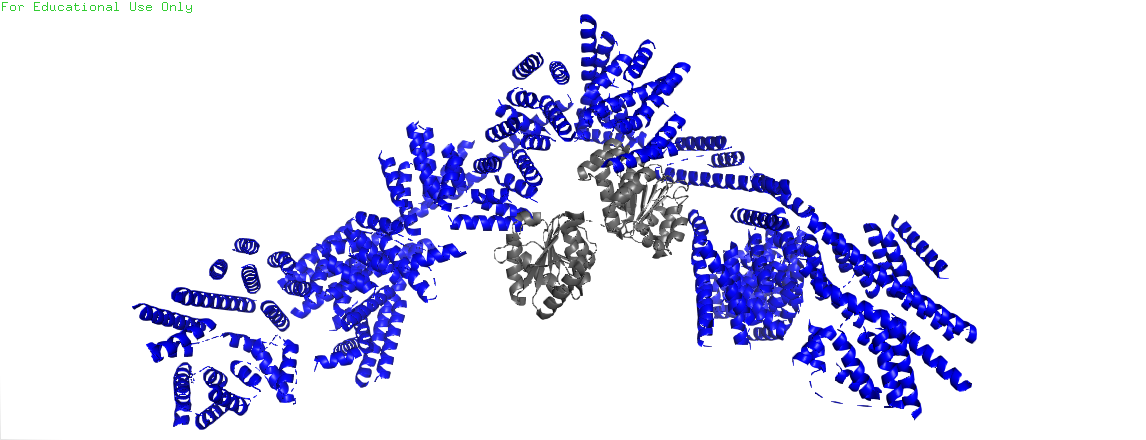
Crystal structure of the THO complex (blue) bound to Sub2 (grey). PDB: 5suq

The human THO complex comprises six subunits, THOC1, −2, –3, −5, –6, and −7. Four of them have counterparts in Saccharomyces cerevisiae: THOC1 (yeast Hpr1), −2 (yeast Tho2), −3 (yeast Tex3), and −7 (yeast Mft1). THOC1 is the first protein identified in THO complex. THOC2 is the largest subunit of TREX. It acts as a scaffold for the formation of the complex. The C-terminal domain of THOC2 directly interacts with nucleic acids. Mutational variants of THOC2 have been associated with syndromic intellectual disabilities, causing seizures, tremors, speech delays, and more. THOC 3 and 6 both contains WD40 repeat motifs that allow interaction with other THO proteins. THOC5 and THOC7 binds tightly and forms a dimer at their coiled coil domain (CCD). Four THO complexes form a tetramer, and each THO complex binds with one UAP56 protein at THOC2 and THOC1.

=== DDX39/UAP56 ===
DDX39, or U2AF65-associated protein 56 (UAP56, Sub2 in yeast) is a DEAD-box ATPase essential for pre-mRNA splicing, but is also a key component of the TREX complex. DDX39 is very similar to UAP56, sharing 90% of the amino acid sequence. UAP56 travels along genes with the THO complex, where it interacts with the sugar-phosphate backbone of the mRNA. UAP56 functions to recruit ALYREF, an RNA export adaptor, to the spliced or intronless mRNA. After transfer of the mRNA from UAP56 to ALYREF, UAP56 dissociates from the complex, allowing the binding of export factor NXF1 to ALYREF at the same site.

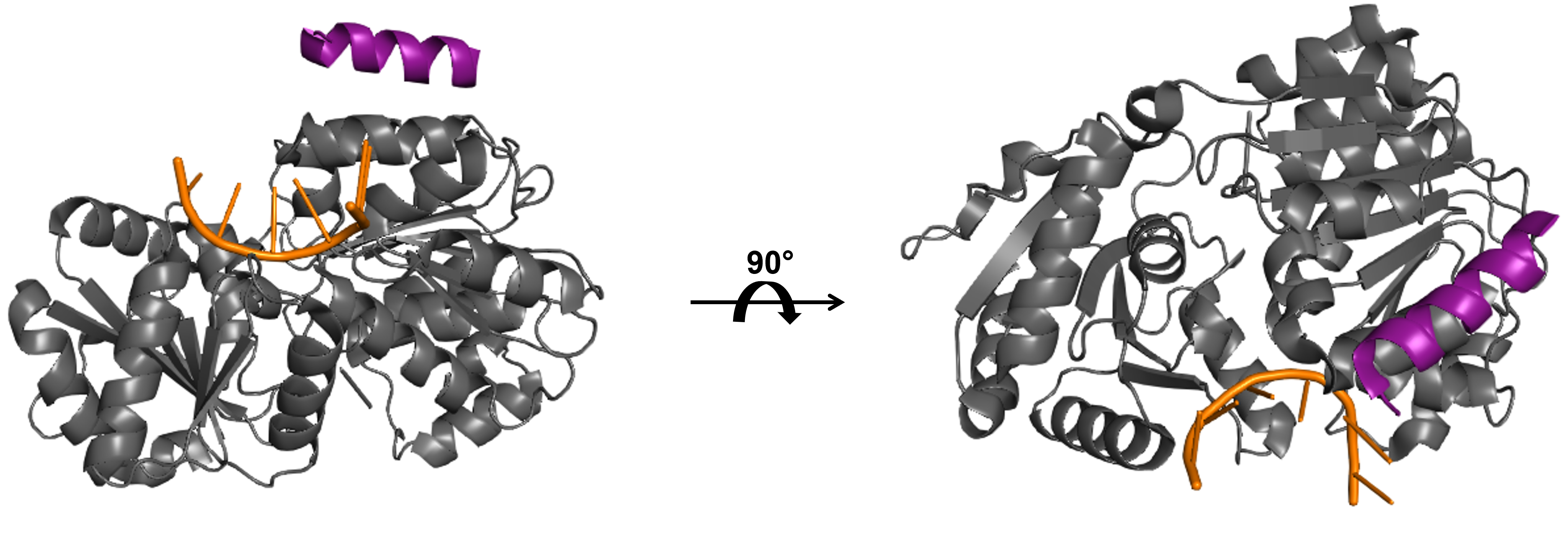
Crystal Structure of Sub2 (grey) and Yra1 (purple) complexed with mRNA (orange). PDB: 5sup

DDX39B
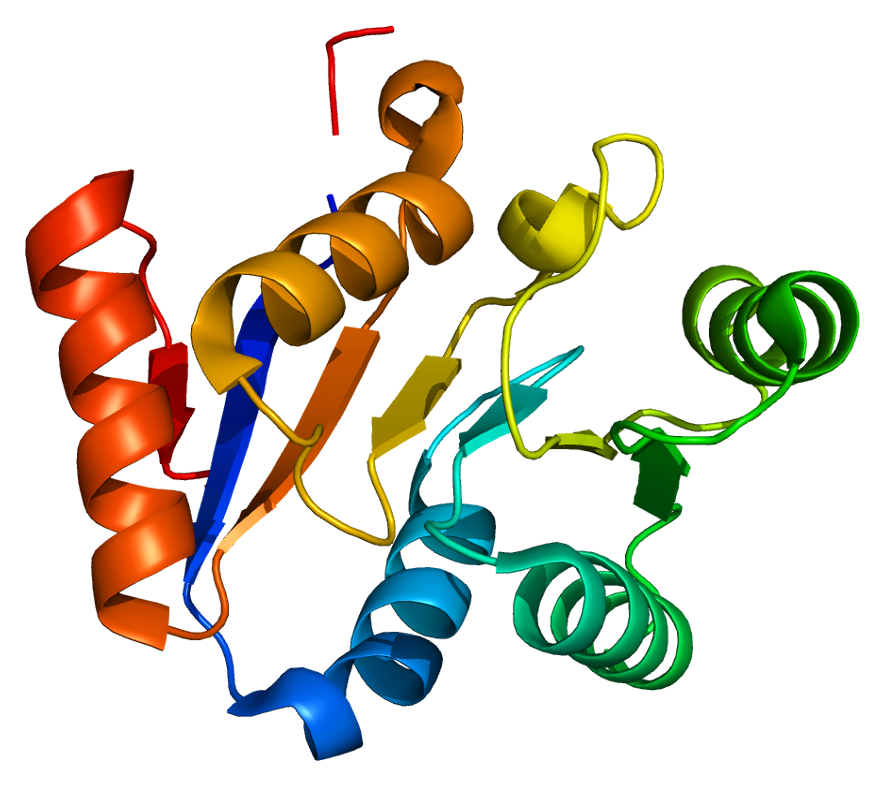

Identifiers
- Aliases: DDX39B, BAT1, D6S81E, UAP56, DEAD-box helicase 39B, DExD-box helicase 39B
- External IDs: OMIM: 142560; MGI: 99240; GeneCards: DDX39B
Available structures
PDB	Ortholog search: PDBe RCSB
PDB	List of PDB id codes 1T5I, 1T6N, 1XTI, 1XTJ, 1XTK
Enzyme activity
EC #	BRENDA	ExPASy	KEGG	MetaCyc
3.6.4.13	↗	↗	↗	↗

Gene location (Human)
Chr.	Chromosome 6 (human)
Band	6p21.33	Start	31,530,219 bp
Band	6p21.33	End	31,542,448 bp

Gene location (Mouse)
Chr.	Chromosome 17 (mouse)
Band	17 B1|17 18.6 cM	Start	35,460,722 bp
Band	17 B1|17 18.6 cM	End	35,472,683 bp
RNA expression pattern
Bgee	Human / Mouse (ortholog); Top expressed in: granulocyte; ganglionic eminence; anterior pituitary; ventricular zone; right uterine tube; right hemisphere of cerebellum; right lobe of thyroid gland; left lobe of thyroid gland; left ovary; body of uterus / Top expressed in: primitive streak; abdominal wall; maxillary prominence; mandibular prominence; medullary collecting duct; renal corpuscle; vas deferens; efferent ductule; hair follicle; ventricular zone; More reference expression data
BioGPS	More reference expression data
Gene ontology
Molecular function	nucleotide binding; helicase activity; protein-containing complex binding; U4 snRNA binding; ATP-dependent protein binding; protein binding; nucleic acid binding; hydrolase activity; ATP binding; U6 snRNA binding; ATP-dependent activity, acting on RNA; ATPase activity; identical protein binding; RNA binding
Cellular component	cytoplasm; transcription export complex; nuclear matrix; U6 snRNP; spliceosomal complex; U4 snRNP; nucleus; nucleoplasm; nuclear speck; nucleolus; protein-containing complex
Biological process	mRNA splicing, via spliceosome; mRNA transport; negative regulation of DNA damage checkpoint; mRNA processing; viral mRNA export from host cell nucleus; positive regulation of translation; mRNA export from nucleus; positive regulation of DNA-templated transcription, elongation; spliceosomal complex assembly; RNA secondary structure unwinding; RNA splicing; positive regulation of DNA biosynthetic process; liver development; positive regulation of cell growth involved in cardiac muscle cell development; positive regulation of vascular associated smooth muscle cell proliferation; mRNA 3'-end processing; termination of RNA polymerase II transcription; RNA export from nucleus; transport
Sources:Amigo / QuickGO
Orthologs
Databases	NCBI: entry; OMA: entry
Species	Human	Mouse
Entrez	7919	53817
Ensembl	ENSG00000198563; ENSG00000225073; ENSG00000237889; ENSG00000229496; ENSG00000215425 ENSG00000235439; ENSG00000225859; ENSG00000230624	ENSMUSG00000019432
UniProt	Q13838	Q9Z1N5
RefSeq (mRNA)	NM_004640; NM_080598	NM_001252457; NM_019693
RefSeq (protein)	NP_004631; NP_542165	NP_001239386; NP_062667
Location (UCSC)	Chr 6: 31.53 – 31.54 Mb	Chr 17: 35.46 – 35.47 Mb
PubMed search
- Wikidata
View/Edit Human	View/Edit Mouse

==== DDX39a ====
In mammalian cells, a paralog of DDX39b, DDX39a, exists, and is somewhat functionally redundant. Knockdown of both paralogs is required to block mRNA export, but depletion of either paralog affects different forms of mRNAs. DDX39b is shown to associate with THO and ALYREF, and DDX39a with CIP29 and ALYREF.

=== ALYREF ===
ALYREF (Yra1 in yeast) is an essential RNA export adapter involved in the export of both spliced and intronless mRNAs. The N and C-termini of ALYREF both contain UAP56-bonding motifs (UBMs), which are necessary for its interaction with UAP56. ALYREF also contains an RNA recognition motif (RRM) that weakly binds RNA, and is flanked by two arginine-rich RNA binding sites. ALYREF alone cannot bind mRNA effectively, and requires interaction with UAP56 to bind the mRNA in the TREX Complex (see Figure 3). These arginine-rich sites are also necessary for ALYREF's interaction with export receptor NXF1, which stimulates the transfer of the mRNA from ALYREF to NXF1. Like UAP56, ALYREF dissociates prior to nuclear export of the mRNA. The unstructured and flexible nature of ALYREF indicates it may play a key role in packaging the mRNA and proteins into a messenger ribonuclear protein (mRNP) for nuclear export.

==== UIF/FYTTD1 ====
UIF, identified through gene homology of ALYREF's UAP56-binding domain, is functionally redundant with ALYREF. Knockdown of ALYREF in mammalian cells results in large upregulation of UIF. UIF can associate with the other TREX complex components in an RNA-independent manner. UIF is speculated to associate with alternative TREX complexes in place of ALYREF, perhaps acting on certain types or mRNAs.

=== CHTOP ===
Originally identified as a RNA-binding protein involved in cell cycle regulation, CHTOP contains two UBMs like those in ALYREF and UIF, and is thought to function in a similar manner to ALYREF. CHTOP has also been shown to stimulate UAP56 ATPase activity. CHTOP is speculated to associate with alternative TREX complexes in place of UAP56, perhaps acting on specific types or mRNAs.

=== SARNP/CIP29 ===
SARNP/CIP29 (yeast Tho1), identified alongside yeast Tho2, forms a trimeric complex with UAP56 and ALYREF, and has been shown to preferentially associate with DDX39a. SARNP stimulates UAP56 ATPase activity.

Conservation of the TREX Complex
	Yeast	Drosophila	Mammals
THO components	Hpr1	Thoc1	Thoc1 (hHpr1)
THO components	Tho2	Thoc2	Thoc2
THO components	Thp2		
THO components	Mft1	Thoc7	Thoc7
THO components		Thoc5	Thoc5 (FMIP)
THO components		Thoc6	Thoc6
THO components	Tex1	Thoc3	Thoc3 (hTEX1)
DEAD-box type helicase	Sub2	Uap56	Uap56
DEAD-box type helicase			DDX39
Adaptor mRNA binding protein	Yra1	Aly	ALYREF

== Associated proteins ==
=== NXF1 ===
NXF1(Mex67p in yeast), also known as nuclear RNA export factor 1, is a multi-domain protein composed of one conserved N-terminal RNA recognition and four leucine-rich repeat motifs, a central NTF2-like domain, and a C-terminal ubiquitin associated domain that mediates interactions with nucleoporins. The NTF2-like domain is able to form heterodimers with NTF2-related export protein-1 (NXT1). The heterodimer binds mRNAs processed by the TREX complex and assists the TREX complex in the nuclear export process.

=== NXT1 ===
NXT1 (Mtr2p in yeast) is also known as p15. It shuttles between the nucleus and the cytoplasm acting as an active nuclear transport protein. NXT1 binds specifically to Ran-GTP and localizes to the nuclear pore complex in mammalian cells. It also stabilizes and forms heterodimers with NXF1. The heterodimer binds mRNAs processed by the TREX complex and assists the TREX complex in the nuclear export process.

=== NCBP1 & NCBP3 ===
NCBP1 and NCBP3 are both part of the cap-binding complex. The two proteins interact with each other as well as the TREX complex in facilitating the mRNA export from the nucleus to the cytoplasm. NCBP3 further interact with exon junction complex proteins for mRNA splicing and stability.

== Role in genome stability, mutations, and diseases ==
The TREX complex is a conserved protein complex that couples transcription to mRNA export and is linked to genome stability and several disorders.

=== Genome stability ===
The TREX complex plays an important role in genome stability. Newly formed RNA strands can hybridize with the single-stranded template DNA sequence during transcription, leading to an R-loop. The R-loop makes the opposing DNA strand more susceptible to cleavage, which can cause DNA damage in cells. The TREX complex associates with the RNA polymerase and newly formed RNA, sequestering the RNA and, therefore, preventing its hybridization to the DNA strand, improving genome stability.

=== Neurodegenerative diseases ===
The TREX complex is associated with several neurodegenerative and neurodevelopmental disorders. These disorders are caused by mutations in the TREX complex itself or in other genes.

==== Direct mutations in TREX subunits ====
Several mutations in the THOC2 gene, part of the THO complex, are associated with disease. For example, missense mutations, or a change in a nucleotide that results in the encoding of a different amino acid, in this gene and translocations on the X chromosome are associated with intellectual disabilities.

The THOC6 gene, part of the THO complex, plays a role in the development of the brain and other organs. Mutations on this gene leads to the incorrect localization of the protein in the cytoplasm, an essential process for neural and organ development. A homozygous mutation in this gene can lead to not only intellectual disability, but cardiac defects and brain malformation.

==== Mutations in other genes ====
Mutations in other genes can also have an indirect dependence on the TREX complex and lead to disease, including familial amyotrophic lateral sclerosis(ALS). ALS is a rare neurodegenerative disease that leads to the death of motor neurons in the brain, resulting in the loss of voluntary movement. In the familial form of the disease, a GGGGCC repeat in an intron of the C9ORF72 gene is expanded in the pre-mRNA, which is exported to the cytoplasm and forms RNA foci. ALYREF binds to the repeat expansion, and an excess recruitment promotes its export. A mutation that disrupts its activity suppresses neurodegeneration, and is enhanced by CHTOP and NXF1.

== See also ==
- THOC1
- THOC2
- THOC5
- BAT1
- DDX39
- ALYREF
- SARNP
- NXT1
- NXF1
