= NXF =

NXF may refer to:

- Protein-coding gene members of the NXF family
  - NXF1
  - NXF2
- National LGBT Federation, a non-governmental organisation in Dublin, Ireland
