= C10orf95 =

Identifiers
- Aliases: C10orf95, chromosome 10 open reading frame 95
- External IDs: GeneCards: C10orf95

Gene location (Human)
Chr.	Chromosome 10 (human)
Band	10q24.32	Start	102,449,837 bp
Band	10q24.32	End	102,451,543 bp
RNA expression pattern
Bgee	Human / Mouse (ortholog); Top expressed in: right uterine tube; olfactory zone of nasal mucosa; cerebellar vermis; nasal epithelium; gonad; secondary oocyte; epithelium of bronchus; bronchial epithelial cell; corpus epididymis; caput epididymis / n/a; More reference expression data
BioGPS	n/a
Orthologs
Databases	NCBI: entry; OMA: entry
Species	Human	Mouse
Entrez	79946	n/a
Ensembl	ENSG00000120055	n/a
UniProt	Q9H7T3	n/a
RefSeq (mRNA)	NM_024886; NM_001363580	n/a
RefSeq (protein)	NP_079162; NP_001350509	n/a
Location (UCSC)	Chr 10: 102.45 – 102.45 Mb	n/a
PubMed search		n/a
- Wikidata
View/Edit Human

Chromosome 10 open reading frame 95 is a protein that in humans is encoded by the c10orf95 gene. The protein is involved in pre-mRNA splicing and is localized to the nucleus in most tissues.

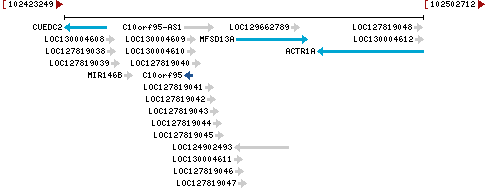
Gene neighborhood for c10orf95 that is located on human chromosome 10.

== Gene ==
C10orf95 is located at 10q24.32. It has two exons and spans 1907 base pairs. No splice isoforms or variants are known.

=== Gene neighborhood ===
The gene neighborhood of c10orf95 consists of c10orf95 antisense 1 (c10orf95-AS1), CUE domain containing 2 (CUEDC2), major facilitator superfamily domain containing 13A (MFSD13A), and actin related protein 1A (ACTR1A). The CUEDC2 gene enables ubiquitin binding activity and is involved in cytokine production in inflammatory responses. The MFSD13A gene is located in the plasma membrane but does not have a defined function. The ACTR1A gene encodes for a subunit of dynactin that binds to both microtubules and cytoplasmic dynein.

== Protein ==
=== Structure ===
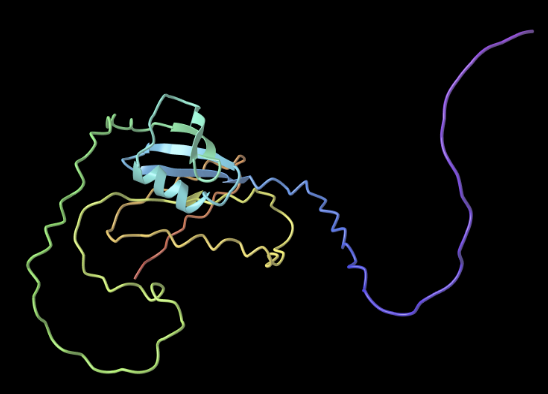
c10orf95 predicted tertiary structure based on secondary structure. The alpha helices and beta sheets appear in the teal color, while the rest of the protein consists of disordered regions.

The c10orf95 protein structure consists of one alpha helix and five beta sheets. The alpha helix is in a region of the amino acid sequence that is conserved all the way from mammals to invertebrates, and it is exposed to the external environment for binding. No transmembrane domains exist. Compared to other human proteins, c10orf95 is arginine rich. Arginine rich regions allow for interactions with negatively charged molecules such as DNA or RNA, and arginine rich proteins have a significant role in pre-mRNA splicing.

=== Properties ===
- Molecular Weight: 23.9kDal
- Interactions: NUS1, DDX39A
- Minus Strand

== Gene level regulation ==
=== Tissue distribution ===
C10orf95 has moderate ubiquitous expression at low levels in most tissues. However, there is higher expression in lung tissue when compared to other tissues. The fetal heart at 10 weeks has moderately high expression that quickly decreases to almost no expression at 20 weeks gestation.

== Protein level regulation ==
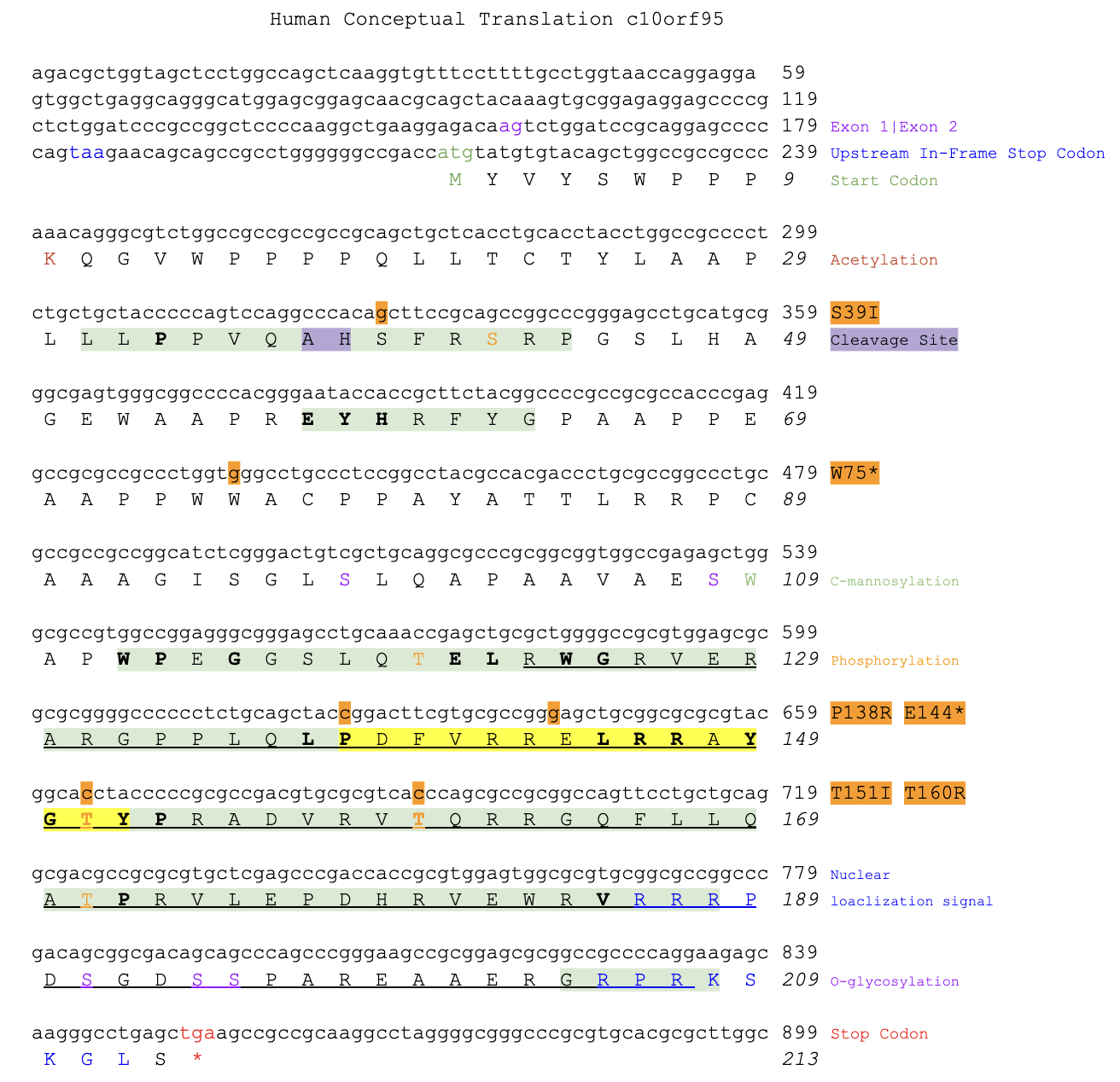
Conceptual translation of c10orf95 transcript showing SNPs, post translational modifications, and conserved regions. A key is provided to determine what the annotations represent.

=== Subcellular localization ===
The c10orf95 protein is likely to be localized to the nucleus due to the presence of multiple nuclear localization signals within the amino acid sequence.

=== Post translational modification ===
There is a signal peptide located from amino acid 1 to 37 and a cleavage site between amino acid 37 and 38. Five important phosphorylation sites exist due to their conservation among orthologs. Serine and threonine were the most commonly phosphorylated amino acids.

== Homology ==
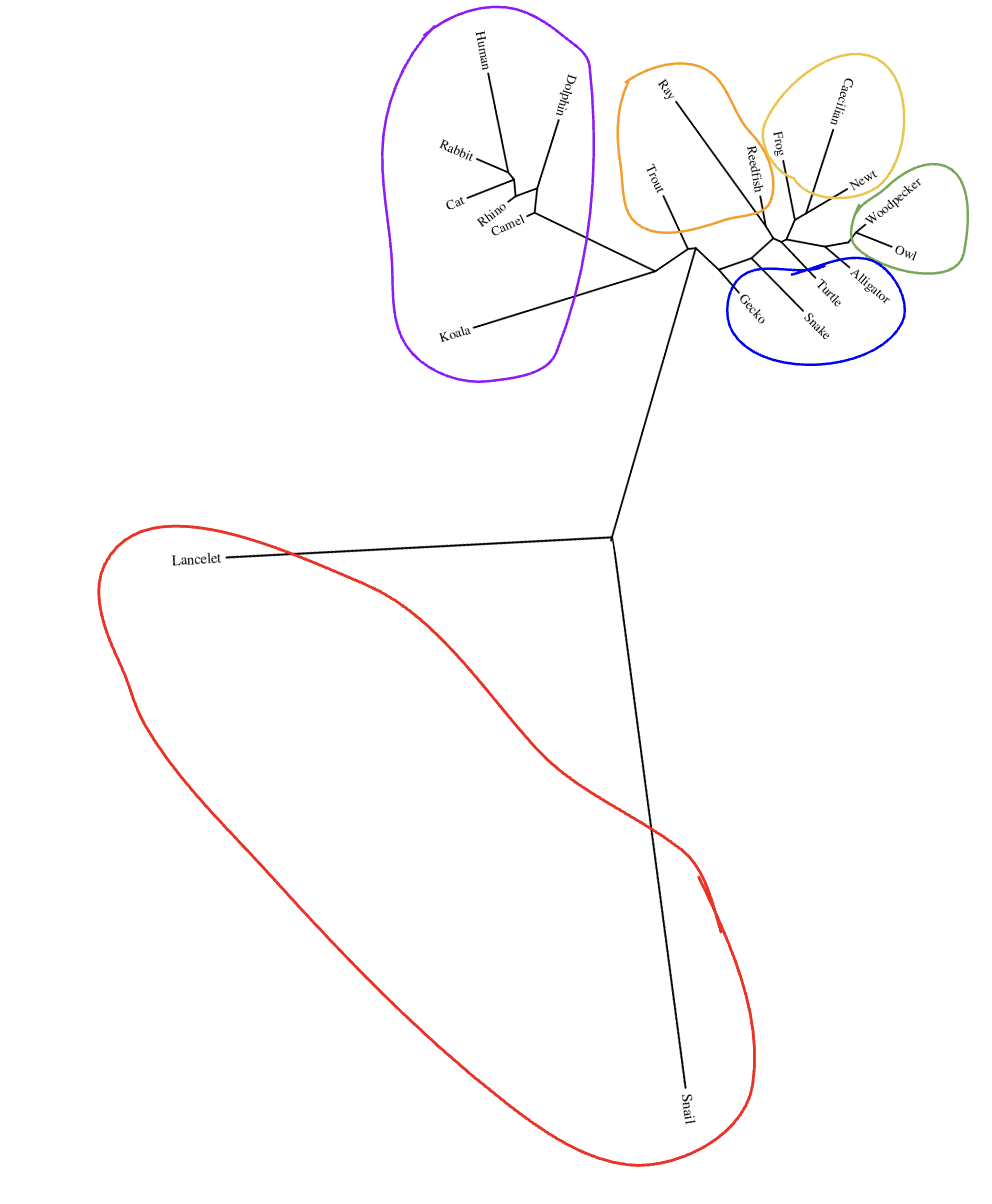
Phylogenetic tree for c10orf95 showing the divergence of species over time. Red is invertebrates, orange is bony fish, yellow is amphibians, green is birds, blue is reptiles, and purple is mammals.

=== Orthologs ===
The table below shows ortholog sequences first sorted by increasing median date of divergence in millions of years ago (MYA) followed by percent sequence identity to the human protein. The most distantly related species to humans are invertebrates (excluding fungi, bacteria, plants) with the furthest median date of divergence being 686 MYA and the average sequence identity being 18.5%. Conversely, the closest related species to humans are other mammals with the closest date of divergence being 87 MYA and the average sequence identity being 57.8%. In between there are reptiles, birds, amphibians, and bony fish that are moderately related with average sequence identities being 34.25%, 31%, 29.67%, and 31.3% respectively. There are no known paralogs.

Genus/Species	Common name	Taxonomic Order	Date of Divergence (MYA)	Accession number	Sequence length (aa)	Sequence identity	Sequence similarity
Homo sapiens	Human	Primate	0	NP_001350509.1	213	100%	100%
Oryctolagus cuniculus	European Rabbit	Lagomorpha	87	XP_051679518.1	217	65%	70%
Tursiops truncatus	Common Bottlenose Dolphin	Artiodactyla	94	XP_033698270.1	219	61%	65%
Prionailurus bengalensis	Leopard Cat	Carnivora	94	XP_043452052.1	219	62%	66%
Diceros bicornis minor	South-central Black Rhinoceros	Perissodactyla	94	XP_058399863.1	211	66%	71%
Phascolarctos cinereus	Koala	Diprotodontia	160	XP_020823116.1	212	33%	47%
Tyto alba	Barn Owl	Strigiformes	319	XP_032844583.1	218	28%	46%
Rhea pennata	Darwin's Rhea	Rheiformes	319	XP_062436384.1	224	31%	48%
Melanerpes formicivorous	Acorn Woodpecker	Piciformes	319	XP_067995321.1	224	34%	52%
Ahaetulla prasina	Asian Vine Snake	Squamata	319	XP_058044567	216	32%	49%
Alligator mississippiensis	American Alligator	Crocodilia	319	XP_014451110.1	223	34%	47%
Caretta caretta	Loggerhead Sea Turtle	Testudines	319	XP_048714142.1	223	35%	49%
Eublepharis macularius	Leopard Gecko	Squamata	319	XP_054839650.1	214	36%	48%
Rhinatrema bivittatum	Two-lined Caecilian	Caecilians	352	XP_029466125.1	215	29%	46%
Pleurodeles waltl	Iberian Ribbed Newt	Urodela	352	KAJ1140798.1	187	29%	44%
Hyperolius riggenbachi	Riggenbach's Reed Frog	Anura	352	XP_068115078.1	216	31%	44%
Erpetoichthys calabaricus	Reedfish	Polypteriformes	429	XP_028651575.1	215	29%	44%
Salvelinus fontinalis	Brook Trout	Salmoniformes	429	XP_055757593.1	221	30%	45%
Mobula hypostoma	Lesser Devil Ray	Myliobatiformes	462	XP_062927344.1	201	35%	49%
Branchiostoma lanceolatum	European Lancelet	Amphioxiformes	581	CAH1258412.1	287	16%	26%
Physella acuta	Bladder Snail	Basommatophora	686	XP_059175428.1	289	21%	29%

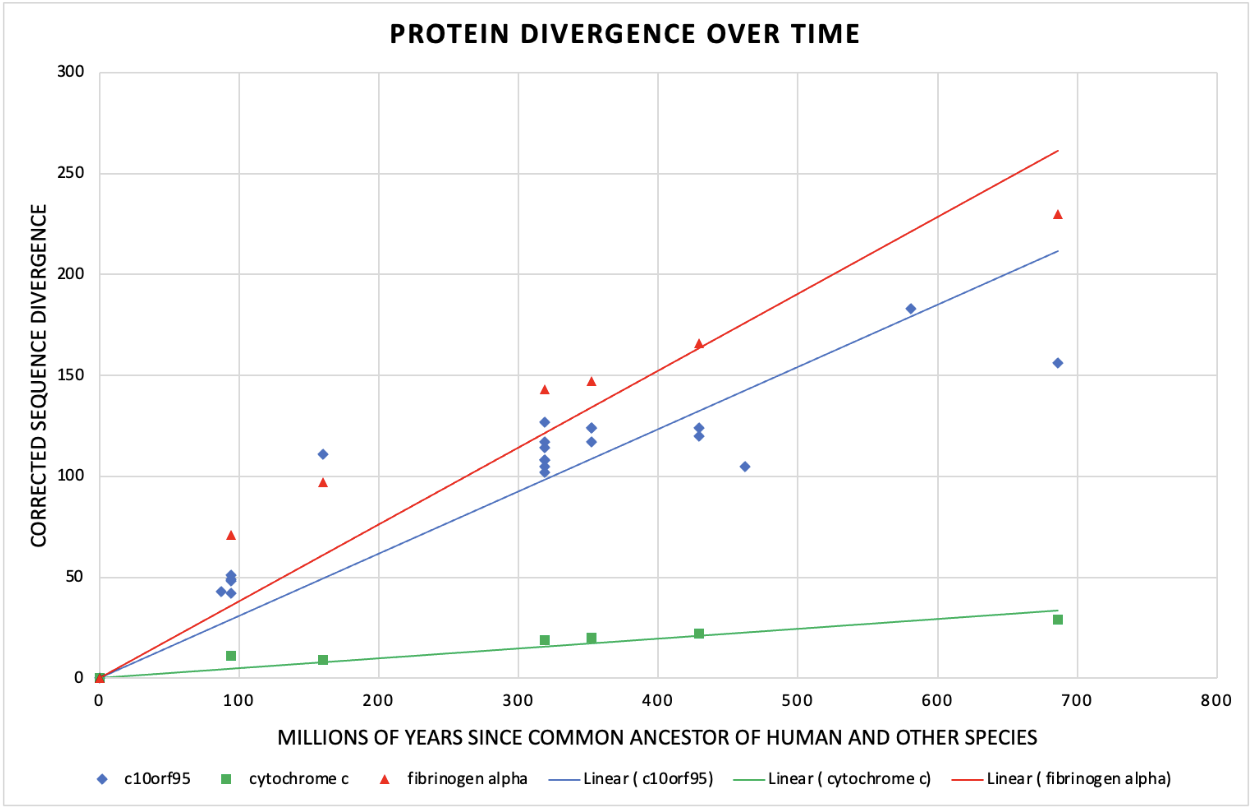
Human c10orf95 evolutionary history compared to the rates of human cytochrome c and fibrinogen alpha.

=== Rate of evolution ===
C10orf95 is estimated to have first appeared in invertebrates about 686 million years ago. Very limited invertebrates had the protein with it only being found in lancelets and a variety of snails. The most distantly related species to humans with c10orf95 is the bladder snail that has no isoforms. The c10orf95 gene appears to evolve fairly quickly based on similarity to fibrinogen alpha evolution.

== Interacting proteins ==
Protein	Interaction Type	Detection Method	Interacting Protein Function	Score
DDX39A (DExD-box helicase 39A)	Physical Association	Anti-tag coimmunoprecipitation	ATP-dependent RNA helicase DDX39A; Involved in pre-mRNA splicing. Required for the export of mRNA out of the nucleus; Belongs to the DEAD box helicase family. DECD subfamily.	0.292
NUS1 (nuclear undecaprenyl pyrophosphate synthase 1)	Physical Association	Anti-tag coimmunoprecipitation	This gene encodes a type I single transmembrane domain receptor, which is a subunit of cis-prenyltransferase, and serves as a specific receptor for the neural and cardiovascular regulator Nogo-B. The encoded protein is essential for dolichol synthesis and protein glycosylation.	0.292

== Clinical significance ==
One study done on asthma found that c10orf95 was downregulated in the peripheral blood of asthmatics. Additionally, c10orf95 was listed as a commonly downregulated gene between the severe versus normal asthma and severe versus mild groups. Another study has identified a SNP at position 39 as a variant connected to an increased risk of late onset Alzheimer's disease.
