= THOC1 =

Protein-coding gene in the species Homo sapiens

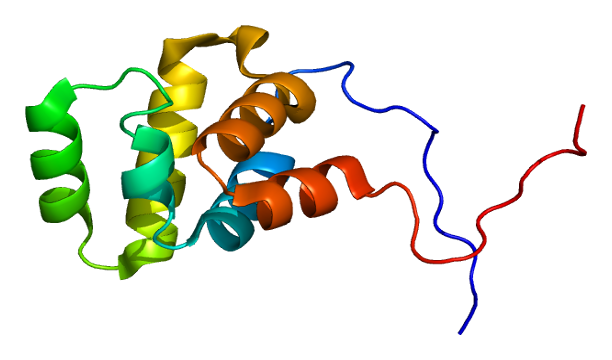
Available structures
| PDB | Ortholog search: PDBe RCSB |
| PDB | List of PDB id codes 1WXP |

Identifiers
- Aliases: THOC1, HPR1, P84, P84N5, THO complex 1
- External IDs: OMIM: 606930; MGI: 1919668; HomoloGene: 38012; GeneCards: THOC1; OMA:THOC1 - orthologs

Gene location (Human)
| Chr. | Chromosome 18 (human) |
| Band | 18p11.32 | Start | 214,520 bp |
| Band | 18p11.32 | End | 268,050 bp |

Gene location (Mouse)
| Chr. | Chromosome 18 (mouse) |
| Band | 18|18 A1 | Start | 9,957,906 bp |
| Band | 18|18 A1 | End | 9,995,489 bp |
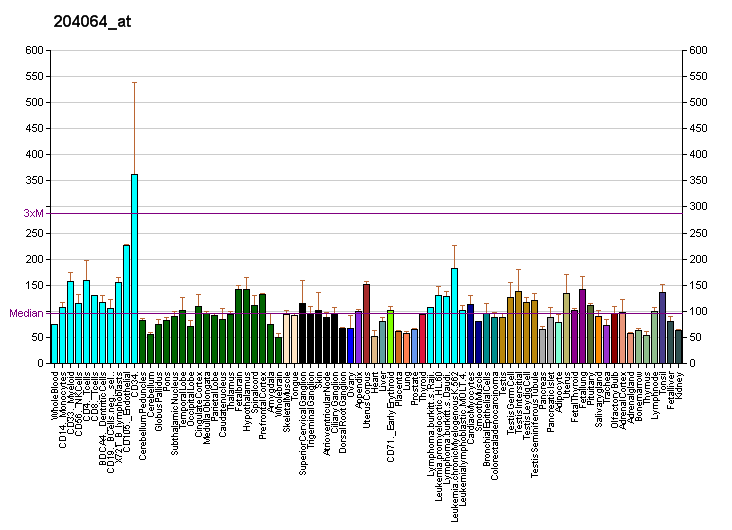
RNA expression pattern
| Bgee | Human / Mouse (ortholog); Top expressed in: Achilles tendon; cerebellar hemisphere; right hemisphere of cerebellum; right uterine tube; anterior pituitary; corpus callosum; left ovary; left lobe of thyroid gland; body of pancreas; tibial nerve / Top expressed in: cumulus cell; spermatocyte; tail of embryo; Gonadal ridge; epiblast; external carotid artery; abdominal wall; primitive streak; spermatid; internal carotid artery; More reference expression data |
| BioGPS | More reference expression data |
Gene ontology
| Molecular function | DNA binding; protein binding; RNA binding |
| Cellular component | cytoplasm; transcription export complex; nuclear matrix; intercellular bridge; THO complex; THO complex part of transcription export complex; nucleus; nucleoplasm; cytosol; nuclear speck |
| Biological process | regulation of DNA recombination; mRNA transport; RNA processing; regulation of transcription, DNA-templated; negative regulation of DNA damage checkpoint; mRNA processing; regulation of DNA-templated transcription, elongation; viral mRNA export from host cell nucleus; transcription, DNA-templated; positive regulation of DNA-templated transcription, elongation; negative regulation of isotype switching to IgA isotypes; RNA splicing; replication fork processing; signal transduction; apoptotic process; RNA export from nucleus; mRNA export from nucleus; mRNA 3'-end processing |
Sources:Amigo / QuickGO
Orthologs
| Species | Human | Mouse |
| Entrez | 9984 | 225160 |
| Ensembl | ENSG00000079134 | ENSMUSG00000024287 |
| UniProt | Q96FV9 | Q8R3N6 |
| RefSeq (mRNA) | NM_005131 | NM_153552 |
| RefSeq (protein) | NP_005122 | NP_705780 |
| Location (UCSC) | Chr 18: 0.21 – 0.27 Mb | Chr 18: 9.96 – 10 Mb |
| PubMed search |
- Wikidata
| View/Edit Human | View/Edit Mouse |

THO complex subunit 1 is a protein that in humans is encoded by the THOC1 gene.

HPR1 is part of the TREX (transcription/export) complex, which includes TEX1 (MIM 606929), THO2 (MIM 300395), ALY (MIM 604171), and UAP56 (MIM 606390).[supplied by OMIM]

== Interactions ==
THOC1 has been shown to interact with Retinoblastoma protein.
