= Nucleoporin 214 =

Protein-coding gene in the species Homo sapiens

NUP214
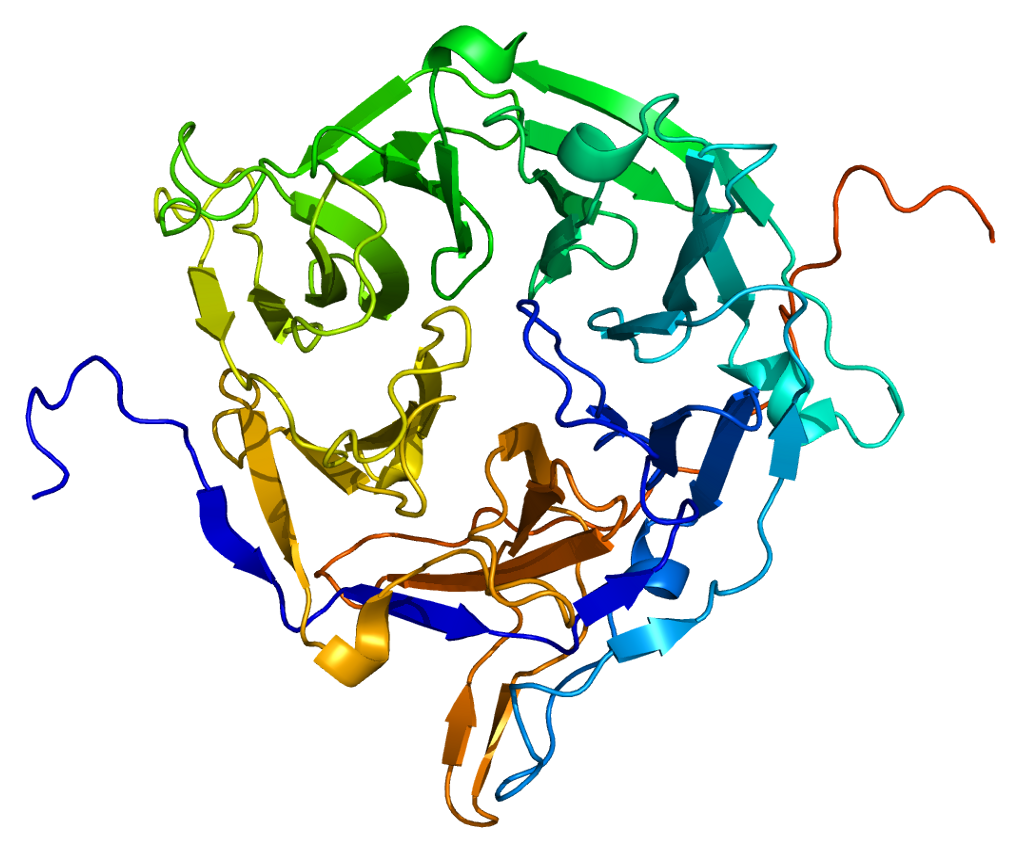

Identifiers
- Aliases: NUP214, CAIN, CAN, D9S46E, N214, p250, nucleoporin 214kDa, nucleoporin 214, IIAE9
- External IDs: OMIM: 114350; MGI: 1095411; GeneCards: NUP214
Available structures
PDB	Ortholog search: PDBe RCSB
PDB	List of PDB id codes 2OIT, 3FHC, 3FMO, 3FMP, 5DIS

Gene location (Human)
Chr.	Chromosome 9 (human)
Band	9q34.13	Start	131,125,573 bp
Band	9q34.13	End	131,234,663 bp

Gene location (Mouse)
Chr.	Chromosome 2 (mouse)
Band	2 B|2 21.97 cM	Start	31,864,448 bp
Band	2 B|2 21.97 cM	End	31,943,987 bp
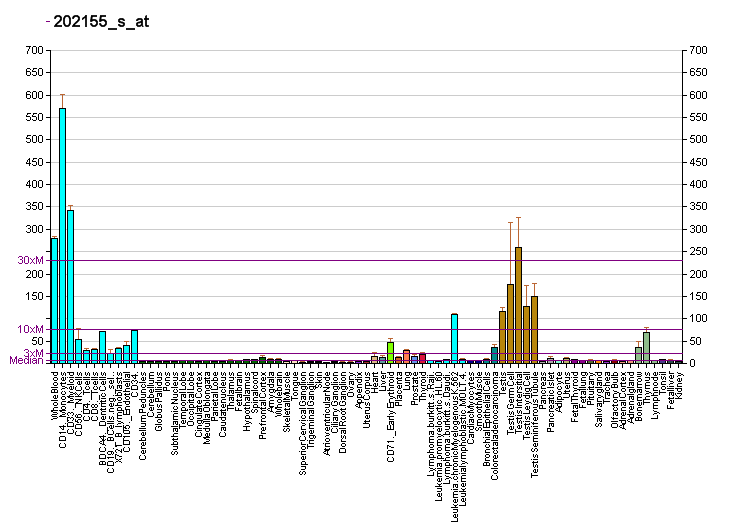

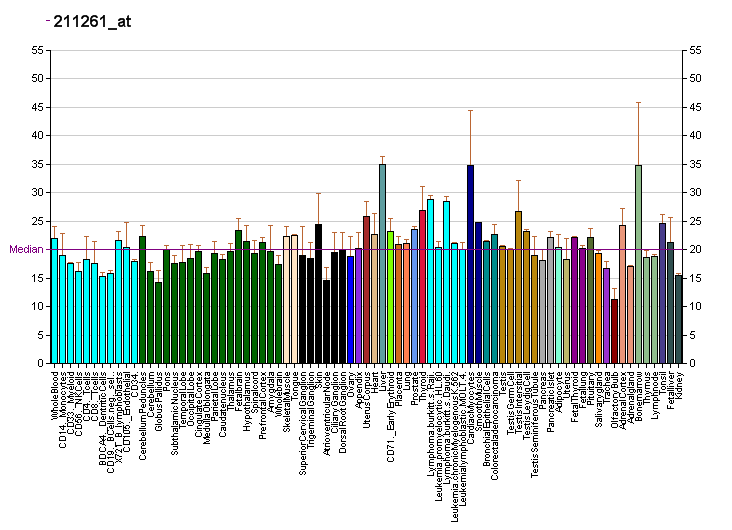
RNA expression pattern
Bgee	Human / Mouse (ortholog); Top expressed in: left testis; right testis; monocyte; granulocyte; testicle; epithelium of colon; blood; bone marrow cell; sural nerve; spleen / Top expressed in: zygote; tail of embryo; secondary oocyte; genital tubercle; blastocyst; morula; embryo; endocardial cushion; spermatid; ventricular zone; More reference expression data
BioGPS	More reference expression data
Gene ontology
Molecular function	nuclear export signal receptor activity; protein binding; nuclear localization sequence binding; structural constituent of nuclear pore
Cellular component	cytosol; intracellular membrane-bounded organelle; focal adhesion; nucleoplasm; nucleus; cytoplasmic side of nuclear pore; nuclear pore nuclear basket; nuclear pore central transport channel; nuclear pore; nuclear envelope; host cell
Biological process	mRNA transport; regulation of mRNA stability; regulation of cell cycle; protein export from nucleus; protein transport; viral process; protein import into nucleus; RNA export from nucleus; mRNA export from nucleus; regulation of nucleocytoplasmic transport; mitotic cell cycle; regulation of glycolytic process; tRNA export from nucleus; protein sumoylation; viral transcription; regulation of gene silencing by miRNA; intracellular transport of virus; regulation of cellular response to heat
Sources:Amigo / QuickGO
Orthologs
Databases	NCBI: entry; OMA: entry
Species	Human	Mouse
Entrez	8021	227720
Ensembl	ENSG00000126883	ENSMUSG00000001855
UniProt	P35658	Q80U93
RefSeq (mRNA)	NM_005085; NM_001318324; NM_001318325	NM_172268
RefSeq (protein)	NP_001305253; NP_001305254; NP_005076	NP_758472; NP_001395026
Location (UCSC)	Chr 9: 131.13 – 131.23 Mb	Chr 2: 31.86 – 31.94 Mb
PubMed search
- Wikidata
View/Edit Human	View/Edit Mouse

Nucleoporin 214 (Nup2014) is a protein that in humans is encoded by the NUP214 gene.

== Function ==
The nuclear pore complex is a massive structure that extends across the nuclear envelope, forming a gateway that regulates the flow of macromolecules between the nucleus and the cytoplasm. Nucleoporins are the main components of the nuclear pore complex in eukaryotic cells. This gene is a member of the FG repeat-containing nucleoporins. The protein encoded by this gene is localized to the cytoplasmic face of the nuclear pore complex where it is required for proper cell cycle progression and nucleocytoplasmic transport. The 3' portion of this gene forms a fusion gene with the DEK gene on chromosome 6 in a t(6,9) translocation associated with acute myeloid leukemia and myelodysplastic syndrome.

== Structure ==
The structure of the N-terminal domain of Nup214 reveals a sevenbladed beta-propeller fold followed by a 30-residue C-terminal extended peptide segment (CTE). The CTE folds back onto the beta propeller and binds to its bottom face. The structure of the Nup214 NTD bound to the helicase Ddx19 in its ADP-bound state reveals the molecular basis for the interaction between the two proteins. A conserved residue of Ddx19 is shown to be crucial for complex formation in vitro and in vivo. Strikingly, the interaction surfaces exhibit strongly opposing surface potentials, with the helicase surface being positively and the Nup214 surface being negatively charged. Ddx19 is shown to bind RNA only in its ATP-bound state, and the binding of RNA and the Nup214 NTD is mutually exclusive.

== Interactions ==
NUP214 has been shown to interact with:

- DDX19,
- CRM1
- NXF1, and
- NXF2, and
- ZFP36.
