= ZFP36 =

Protein-coding gene in the species Homo sapiens

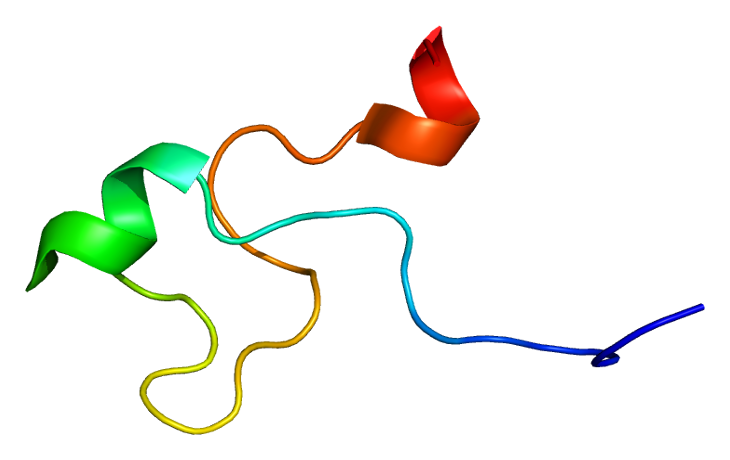

Identifiers
- Aliases: ZFP36, G0S24, GOS24, NUP475, RNF162A, TIS11, TTP, zfp-36, ZFP36 ring finger protein
- External IDs: OMIM: 190700; MGI: 99180; GeneCards: ZFP36
Available structures
PDB	Ortholog search: PDBe RCSB
PDB	List of PDB id codes 4J8S

Gene location (Human)
Chr.	Chromosome 19 (human)
Band	19q13.2	Start	39,406,847 bp
Band	19q13.2	End	39,409,412 bp

Gene location (Mouse)
Chr.	Chromosome 7 (mouse)
Band	7 A3|7 16.72 cM	Start	28,076,209 bp
Band	7 A3|7 16.72 cM	End	28,079,678 bp
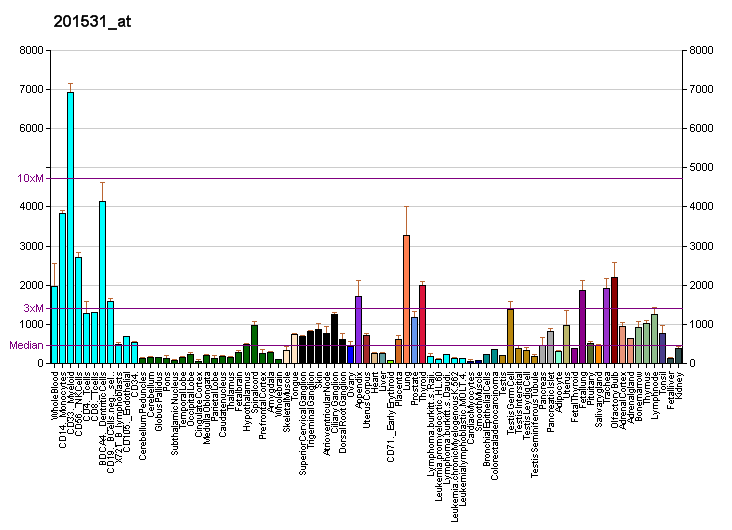
RNA expression pattern
Bgee	Human / Mouse (ortholog); Top expressed in: vena cava; gastric mucosa; left uterine tube; trachea; saphenous vein; cardia; nipple; gallbladder; upper lobe of left lung; right lung / Top expressed in: granulocyte; stroma of bone marrow; left lobe of liver; ascending aorta; aortic valve; mesenteric lymph nodes; jejunum; left lung lobe; duodenum; decidua; More reference expression data
BioGPS	More reference expression data
Gene ontology
Molecular function	DNA binding; C-C chemokine binding; 14-3-3 protein binding; metal ion binding; protein binding; single-stranded RNA binding; mRNA 3'-UTR AU-rich region binding; enzyme binding; mRNA binding; protein kinase binding; RNA binding; heat shock protein binding; RNA polymerase binding; mRNA 3'-UTR binding
Cellular component	cytoplasm; cytoplasmic stress granule; nucleus; RISC-loading complex; ribonucleoprotein complex; Dcp1-Dcp2 complex; exosome (RNase complex); P-body; cytosol; CCR4-NOT complex
Biological process	nuclear-transcribed mRNA poly(A) tail shortening; positive regulation of nuclear-transcribed mRNA poly(A) tail shortening; mRNA catabolic process; regulation of tumor necrosis factor production; negative regulation of transcription by RNA polymerase II; nuclear-transcribed mRNA catabolic process, deadenylation-dependent decay; miRNA-mediated gene silencing by inhibition of translation; response to starvation; 3'-UTR-mediated mRNA stabilization; negative regulation of erythrocyte differentiation; cellular response to lipopolysaccharide; cellular response to tumor necrosis factor; positive regulation of nuclear-transcribed mRNA catabolic process, deadenylation-dependent decay; positive regulation of deadenylation-independent decapping of nuclear-transcribed mRNA; regulation of keratinocyte apoptotic process; regulation of keratinocyte proliferation; positive regulation of fat cell differentiation; cellular response to fibroblast growth factor stimulus; cellular response to granulocyte macrophage colony-stimulating factor stimulus; negative regulation of viral transcription; regulation of keratinocyte differentiation; response to wounding; positive regulation of gene silencing by miRNA; regulation of mRNA stability; MAPK cascade; cellular response to glucocorticoid stimulus; cellular response to epidermal growth factor stimulus; positive regulation of intracellular mRNA localization; p38MAPK cascade; nuclear-transcribed mRNA catabolic process, deadenylation-independent decay; gene silencing; mRNA transport; 3'-UTR-mediated mRNA destabilization; negative regulation of polynucleotide adenylyltransferase activity; transport
Sources:Amigo / QuickGO
Orthologs
Databases	NCBI: entry; OMA: entry
Species	Human	Mouse
Entrez	7538	22695
Ensembl	ENSG00000128016	ENSMUSG00000044786
UniProt	P26651	P22893
RefSeq (mRNA)	NM_003407	NM_011756
RefSeq (protein)	NP_003398	NP_035886
Location (UCSC)	Chr 19: 39.41 – 39.41 Mb	Chr 7: 28.08 – 28.08 Mb
PubMed search
- Wikidata
View/Edit Human	View/Edit Mouse

Tristetraprolin (TTP), also known as zinc finger protein 36 homolog (ZFP36), is a protein that in humans, mice and rats is encoded by the ZFP36 gene. It is a member of the TIS11 (TPA-induced sequence) family, along with butyrate response factors 1 and 2.

TTP binds to AU-rich elements (AREs) in the 3'-untranslated regions (UTRs) of the mRNAs of some cytokines and promotes their degradation. For example, TTP is a component of a negative feedback loop that interferes with TNF-alpha production by destabilizing its mRNA. Mice deficient in TTP develop a complex syndrome of inflammatory diseases.

== Interactions ==
ZFP36 has been shown to interact with 14-3-3 protein family members, such as YWHAH, and with NUP214, a member of the nuclear pore complex.

== Regulation ==
Post-transcriptionally, TTP is regulated in several ways. The subcellular localization of TTP is influenced by interactions with protein partners such as the 14-3-3 family of proteins. These interactions and, possibly, interactions with target mRNAs are affected by the phosphorylation state of TTP, as the protein can be posttranslationally modified by a large number of protein kinases. There is some evidence that the TTP transcript may also be targeted by microRNAs, such as miR-29a.
