= THOC5 =

Protein-coding gene in the species Homo sapiens

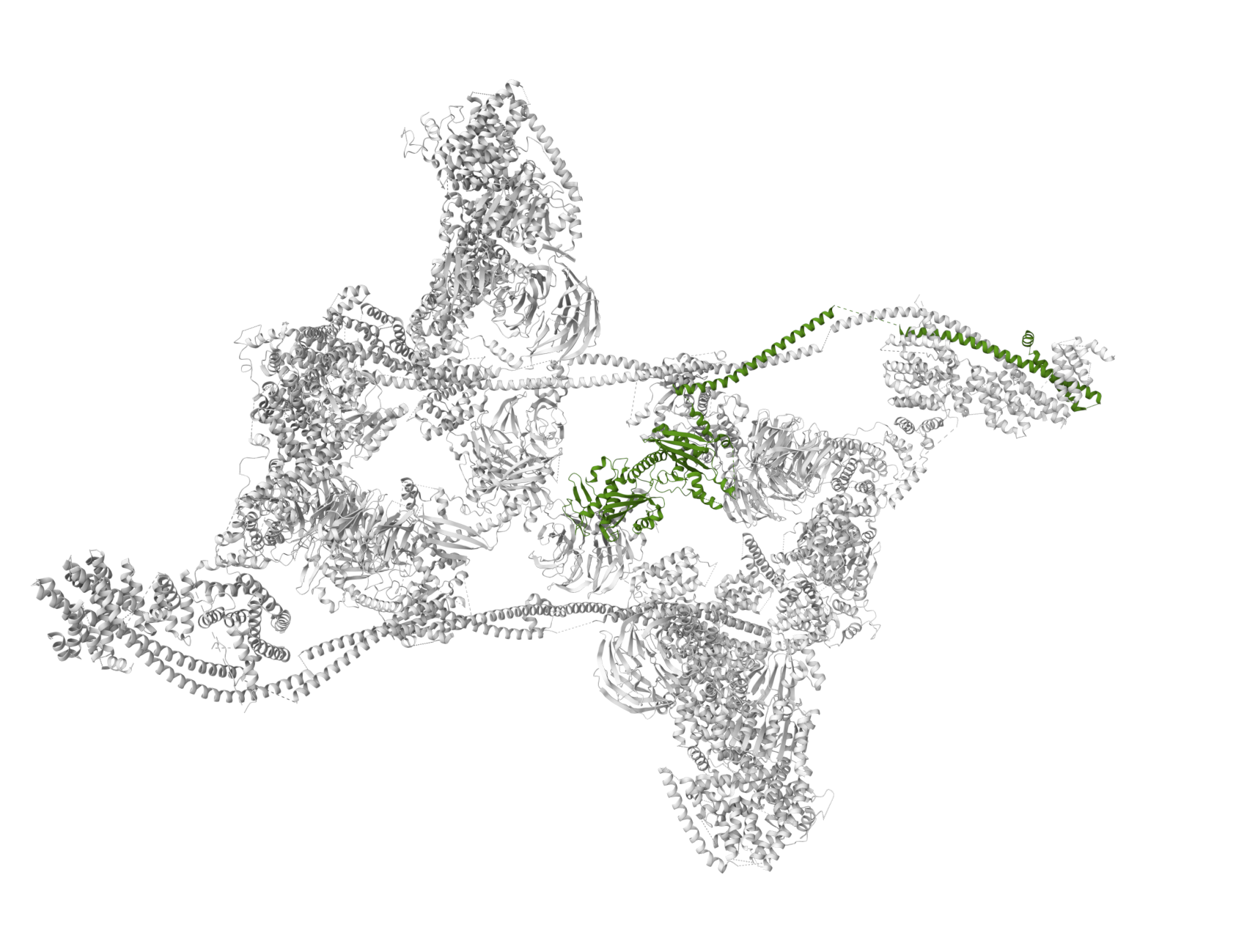

Identifiers
- Aliases: THOC5, C22orf19, Fmip, PK1.3, fSAP79, THO complex 5
- External IDs: OMIM: 612733; MGI: 1351333; GeneCards: THOC5

Gene location (Human)
Chr.	Chromosome 22 (human)
Band	22q12.2	Start	29,505,879 bp
Band	22q12.2	End	29,555,216 bp

Gene location (Mouse)
Chr.	Chromosome 11 (mouse)
Band	11|11 A1	Start	4,845,320 bp
Band	11|11 A1	End	4,878,867 bp
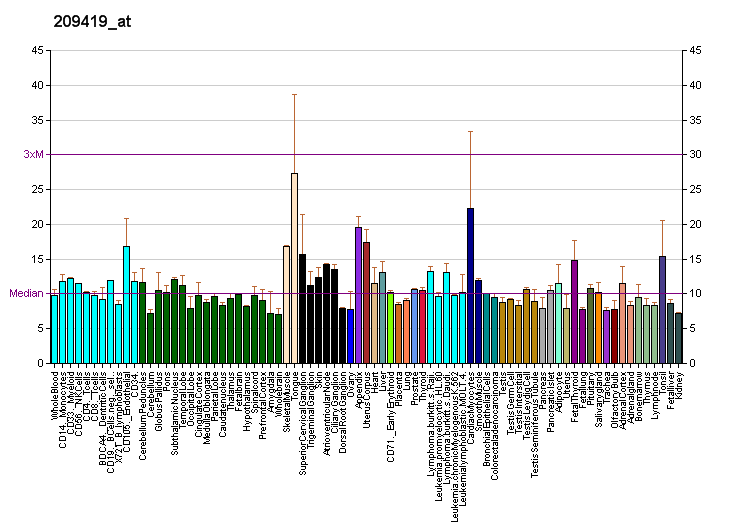

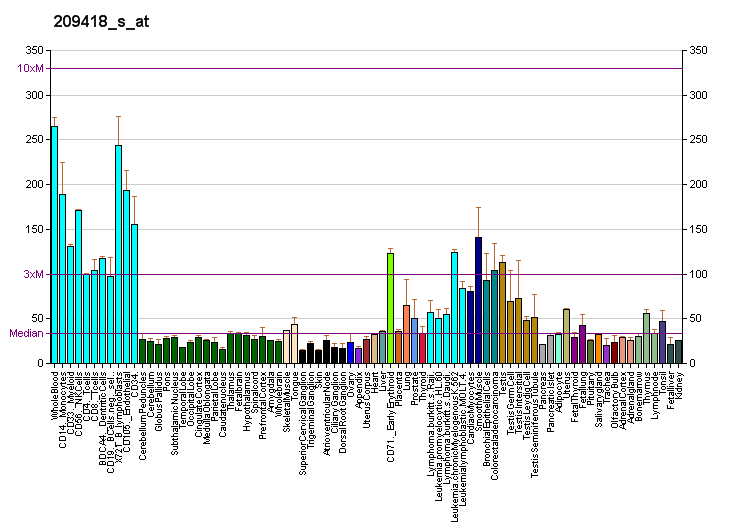
RNA expression pattern
Bgee	Human / Mouse (ortholog); Top expressed in: gastric mucosa; stromal cell of endometrium; Achilles tendon; muscle layer of sigmoid colon; popliteal artery; tibial arteries; body of uterus; ascending aorta; right coronary artery; apex of heart / Top expressed in: superior cervical ganglion; otic vesicle; neural layer of retina; interventricular septum; seminiferous tubule; spermatid; tail of embryo; spermatocyte; ventricular zone; epiblast; More reference expression data
BioGPS	More reference expression data
Gene ontology
Molecular function	protein binding; RNA binding; mRNA binding
Cellular component	cytoplasm; THO complex; THO complex part of transcription export complex; transcription export complex; nucleus; nucleoplasm; nuclear chromosome
Biological process	positive regulation of DNA-templated transcription, elongation; primitive hemopoiesis; mRNA processing; cell differentiation; mRNA transport; viral mRNA export from host cell nucleus; negative regulation of DNA damage checkpoint; monocyte differentiation; RNA splicing; RNA export from nucleus; mRNA export from nucleus; mRNA 3'-end processing
Sources:Amigo / QuickGO
Orthologs
Databases	NCBI: entry; OMA: entry
Species	Human	Mouse
Entrez	8563	107829
Ensembl	ENSG00000100296	ENSMUSG00000034274
UniProt	Q13769	Q8BKT7
RefSeq (mRNA)	NM_001002877; NM_001002878; NM_001002879; NM_003678	NM_172438
RefSeq (protein)	NP_001002877; NP_001002878; NP_001002879; NP_003669	NP_766026
Location (UCSC)	Chr 22: 29.51 – 29.56 Mb	Chr 11: 4.85 – 4.88 Mb
PubMed search
- Wikidata
View/Edit Human	View/Edit Mouse

THO complex subunit 5 homolog is a protein that in humans is encoded by the THOC5 gene. THOCs is a member of THO complex which is a subcomplex of the transcription/export complex (TREX).

THOC5 is evolutionarily conserved in higher eukaryotes, however the exact roles of THOC5 in transcription and mRNA export are still unclear. THOC5 is phosphorylated by several protein kinases at multiple residues upon extracellular stimuli. These include stimulation with growth factors/cytokines/chemokines, or DNA damage reagents. Furthermore, THOC5 is a substrate for several oncogenic tyrosine kinases, suggesting that THOC5 may be involved in cancer development.

Recent THOC5 knockout mouse data reveal that THOC5 is an essential element in the maintenance of stem cells and growth factor/cytokine-mediated differentiation/proliferation. Furthermore, depletion of THOC5 influences less than 1% of total mRNA export in the steady state, however it influences more than 90% of growth factor/cytokine induced genes. THOC5, thereby contributes to the 3′ processing and/or export of immediate-early genes induced by extracellular stimuli. These studies bring new insight into the link between the mRNA export complex and immediate-early gene response. The data from these studies also suggest that THOC5 may be a useful tool for studying stem cell biology, for modifying the differentiation processes and for cancer therapy.
