= THOC2 =

Protein-coding gene in the species Homo sapiens

Identifiers
- Aliases: THOC2, CXorf3, THO2, dJ506G2.1, hTREX120, MRX12, MRX35, THO complex 2
- External IDs: OMIM: 300395; MGI: 2442413; HomoloGene: 69669; GeneCards: THOC2; OMA:THOC2 - orthologs

Gene location (Human)
Chr.	X chromosome (human)
Band	Xq25	Start	123,600,561 bp
Band	Xq25	End	123,733,056 bp

Gene location (Mouse)
Chr.	X chromosome (mouse)
Band	X|X A4	Start	40,883,868 bp
Band	X|X A4	End	41,009,551 bp
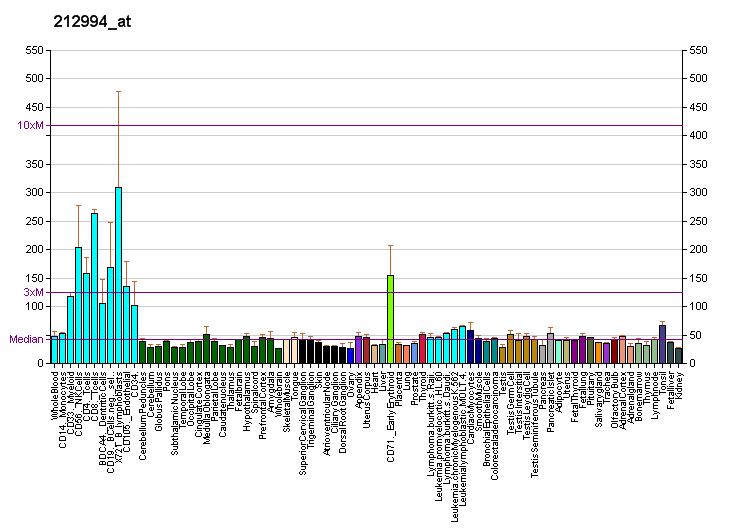

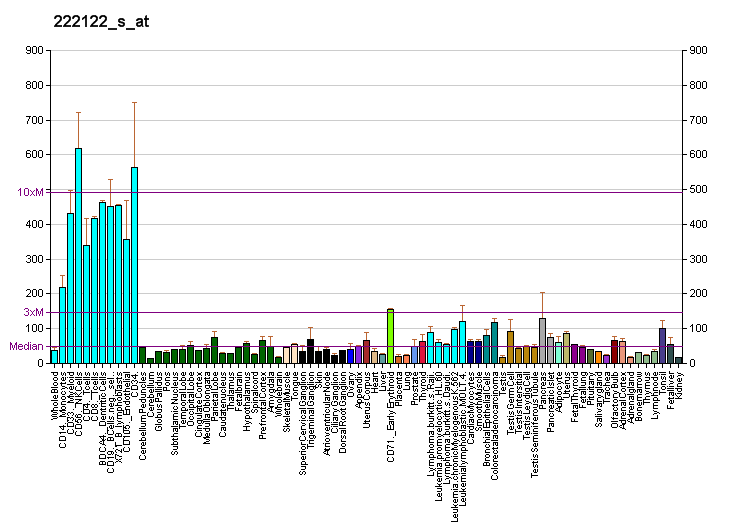
RNA expression pattern
Bgee	Human / Mouse (ortholog); Top expressed in: secondary oocyte; Achilles tendon; sural nerve; ventricular zone; epithelium of colon; right lung; visceral pleura; left ovary; gastric mucosa; body of pancreas / Top expressed in: Rostral migratory stream; sciatic nerve; retinal pigment epithelium; primitive streak; ciliary body; tail of embryo; medullary collecting duct; umbilical cord; vestibular membrane of cochlear duct; median eminence; More reference expression data
BioGPS	More reference expression data
Gene ontology
Molecular function	protein binding; RNA binding; mRNA binding
Cellular component	THO complex; nuclear speck; THO complex part of transcription export complex; transcription export complex; nucleus; nucleoplasm
Biological process	poly(A)+ mRNA export from nucleus; mRNA processing; mRNA transport; neuron development; viral mRNA export from host cell nucleus; RNA splicing; generation of neurons; RNA export from nucleus; mRNA export from nucleus; mRNA 3'-end processing; cell morphogenesis; blastocyst development; regulation of gene expression; regulation of mRNA export from nucleus; negative regulation of neuron projection development; stem cell division
Sources:Amigo / QuickGO
Orthologs
Species	Human	Mouse
Entrez	57187	331401
Ensembl	ENSG00000125676	ENSMUSG00000037475
UniProt	Q8NI27	B1AZI6
RefSeq (mRNA)	NM_001081550; NM_020449	NM_001033422
RefSeq (protein)	NP_001075019	NP_001028594
Location (UCSC)	Chr X: 123.6 – 123.73 Mb	Chr X: 40.88 – 41.01 Mb
PubMed search
- Wikidata
View/Edit Human	View/Edit Mouse

THO complex subunit 2 is a protein that in humans is encoded by the THOC2 gene.

THO2 is part of the TREX (transcription/export) complex, which includes TEX1 (MIM 606929), HPR1 (MIM 606930), ALY (MIM 604171), and UAP56 (MIM 606390).[supplied by OMIM]
