= ALYREF =

Protein-coding gene in the species Homo sapiens

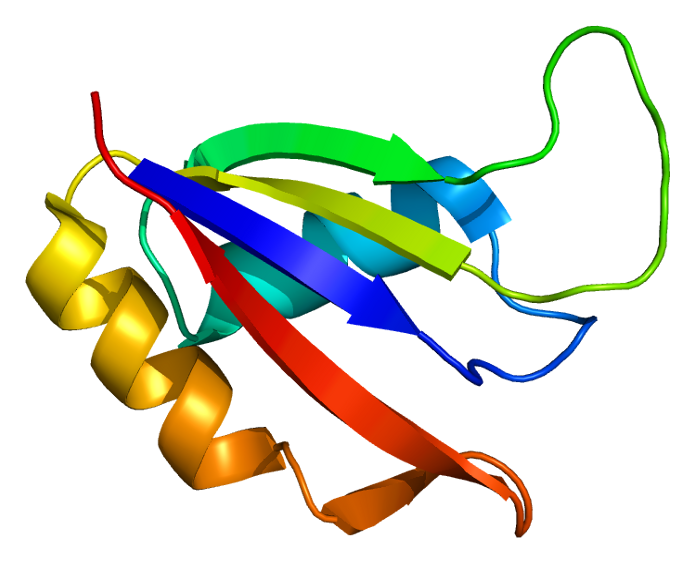

Identifiers
- Aliases: ALYREF, ALY, ALY/REF, BEF, REF, THOC4, Aly/REF export factor
- External IDs: OMIM: 604171; MGI: 1341044; GeneCards: ALYREF
Available structures
PDB	Ortholog search: PDBe RCSB
PDB	List of PDB id codes 3ULH

Gene location (Human)
Chr.	Chromosome 17 (human)
Band	17q25.3	Start	81,887,835 bp
Band	17q25.3	End	81,891,586 bp

Gene location (Mouse)
Chr.	Chromosome 11 (mouse)
Band	11|11 E2	Start	120,482,947 bp
Band	11|11 E2	End	120,489,191 bp
RNA expression pattern
Bgee	Human / Mouse (ortholog); Top expressed in: ganglionic eminence; ventricular zone; stromal cell of endometrium; left testis; mucosa of transverse colon; right testis; monocyte; granulocyte; appendix; skin of abdomen / Top expressed in: maxillary prominence; mandibular prominence; ventricular zone; somite; epiblast; abdominal wall; renal corpuscle; yolk sac; gastrula; thymus; More reference expression data
BioGPS	n/a
Gene ontology
Molecular function	protein binding; nucleic acid binding; RNA binding
Cellular component	cytoplasm; cytosol; nuclear speck; catalytic step 2 spliceosome; membrane; transcription export complex; exon-exon junction complex; spliceosomal complex; extracellular exosome; nucleus; nucleoplasm
Biological process	regulation of DNA recombination; mRNA splicing, via spliceosome; termination of RNA polymerase II transcription; mRNA transport; mRNA processing; viral mRNA export from host cell nucleus; mRNA export from nucleus; positive regulation of DNA-templated transcription, elongation; osteoblast differentiation; replication fork processing; viral process; mRNA 3'-end processing; RNA splicing; RNA export from nucleus; transport
Sources:Amigo / QuickGO
Orthologs
Databases	NCBI: entry; OMA: entry
Species	Human	Mouse
Entrez	10189	21681
Ensembl	ENSG00000183684	ENSMUSG00000025134
UniProt	Q86V81	O08583
RefSeq (mRNA)	NM_005782	NM_011568
RefSeq (protein)	NP_005773	NP_035698
Location (UCSC)	Chr 17: 81.89 – 81.89 Mb	Chr 11: 120.48 – 120.49 Mb
PubMed search
- Wikidata
View/Edit Human	View/Edit Mouse

Aly/REF export factor, also known as THO complex subunit 4, is a protein that in humans is encoded by the ALYREF gene.

The ALYREF gene encodes Aly/REF export factor (ALY; THO complex subunit 4, Tho4; RNA and export factor binding protein 1, Refbp1), a ubiquitously expressed nuclear protein that functions as a molecular chaperone and export adapter involved in nuclear export of spliced and unspliced mRNA. The TRanscription-EXport (TREX) complex, a key player in mRNA export, includes the THO subcomplex, the RNA helicase UAP56, and the RNA-binding protein ALY. In yeast, TREX is recruited co-transcriptionally; in human cells it is recruited during a late step of splicing. The human TREX complex is recruited to a region near the 5' end of mRNA by interaction of ALY and THO with the nuclear cap-binding complex. As a chaperone, ALY promotes dimerization of transcription factors containing basic leucine zipper (bZIP) domains., thereby promoting transcriptional activation. ALY has key roles in 3'-end processing of polyadenylated mRNAs and in nuclear export of both polyadenylated and non-polyadenylated mRNAs. After mRNA binds to ALY, it is apparently transferred to the NXF1-NXT1 heterodimer for export (TAP/NFX1 pathway). The full-length ALY protein (Refbp1-I, 255 amino acids encoded by six exons) has a conserved RNA recognition motif (RRM; amino acids 105-182) flanked by alanine/arginine/glycine-rich sequences; an N-terminal region (amino acids 16-37) is sufficient for RNA binding and interaction with the NXF1-NXT1 heterodimer.
