= SARNP =

Protein-coding gene in the species Homo sapiens

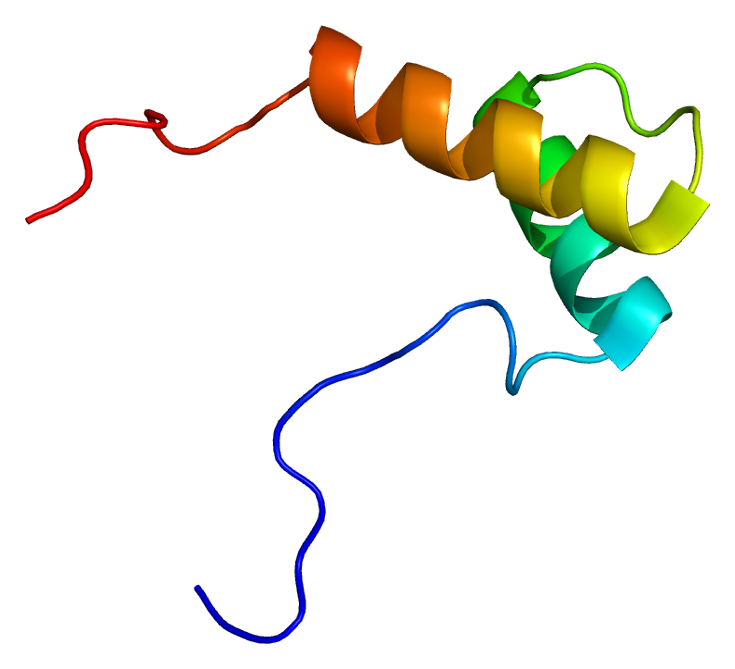
Available structures
PDB	Ortholog search: PDBe RCSB
PDB	List of PDB id codes 2DO1

Identifiers
- Aliases: SARNP, CIP29, HCC1, HSPC316, THO1, SAP domain containing ribonucleoprotein
- External IDs: OMIM: 610049; MGI: 1913368; HomoloGene: 41628; GeneCards: SARNP; OMA:SARNP - orthologs

Gene location (Mouse)
Chr.	Chromosome 10 (mouse)
Band	10|10 D3	Start	128,817,333 bp
Band	10|10 D3	End	128,877,629 bp
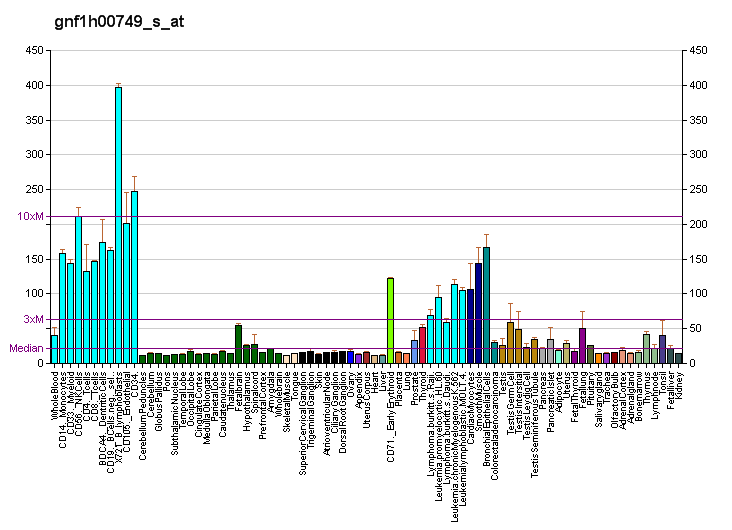

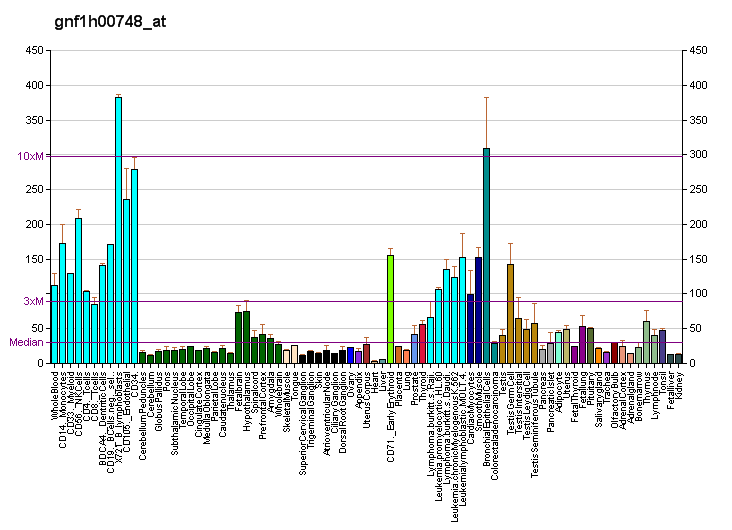
RNA expression pattern
Bgee	Human / Mouse (ortholog); Top expressed in: ganglionic eminence; smooth muscle tissue; Achilles tendon; monocyte; tibial nerve; right adrenal gland; ascending aorta; islet of Langerhans; gastrocnemius muscle; left coronary artery / Top expressed in: ventricular zone; ganglionic eminence; epiblast; lens; neural tube; yolk sac; ovary; thymus; embryo; embryo; More reference expression data
BioGPS	More reference expression data
Gene ontology
Molecular function	DNA binding; protein binding; RNA binding; RNA polymerase II cis-regulatory region sequence-specific DNA binding; DNA-binding transcription repressor activity, RNA polymerase II-specific; protein C-terminus binding; RS domain binding
Cellular component	nuclear speck; transcription export complex; nucleus; nucleoplasm; cytoplasmic ribonucleoprotein granule
Biological process	mRNA transport; regulation of transcription, DNA-templated; regulation of translation; transcription, DNA-templated; RNA export from nucleus; mRNA export from nucleus; termination of RNA polymerase II transcription; mRNA 3'-end processing; transport; negative regulation of transcription by RNA polymerase II
Sources:Amigo / QuickGO
Orthologs
Species	Human	Mouse
Entrez	84324	66118
Ensembl	n/a	ENSMUSG00000078427
UniProt	P82979	Q9D1J3
RefSeq (mRNA)	NM_033082	NM_025364
RefSeq (protein)	NP_149073	NP_079640; NP_001346332; NP_001346333; NP_001346334; NP_001346335 NP_001346336
Location (UCSC)	n/a	Chr 10: 128.82 – 128.88 Mb
PubMed search
- Wikidata
View/Edit Human	View/Edit Mouse

SAP domain-containing ribonucleoprotein is a protein that in humans is encoded by the SARNP gene.
