= DDX39B =

Protein-coding gene in humans

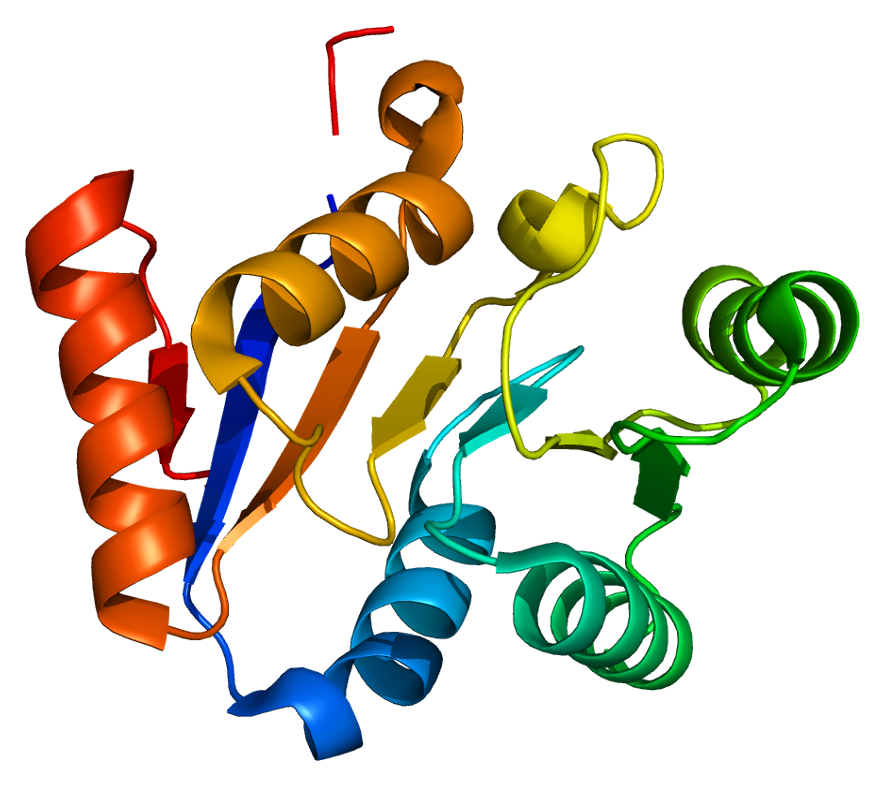

Identifiers
- Aliases: DDX39B, BAT1, D6S81E, UAP56, DEAD-box helicase 39B, DExD-box helicase 39B
- External IDs: OMIM: 142560; MGI: 99240; GeneCards: DDX39B
Available structures
PDB	Ortholog search: PDBe RCSB
PDB	List of PDB id codes 1T5I, 1T6N, 1XTI, 1XTJ, 1XTK
Enzyme activity
EC #	BRENDA	ExPASy	KEGG	MetaCyc
3.6.4.13	↗	↗	↗	↗

Gene location (Human)
Chr.	Chromosome 6 (human)
Band	6p21.33	Start	31,530,219 bp
Band	6p21.33	End	31,542,448 bp

Gene location (Mouse)
Chr.	Chromosome 17 (mouse)
Band	17 B1|17 18.6 cM	Start	35,460,722 bp
Band	17 B1|17 18.6 cM	End	35,472,683 bp
RNA expression pattern
Bgee	Human / Mouse (ortholog); Top expressed in: granulocyte; ganglionic eminence; anterior pituitary; ventricular zone; right uterine tube; right hemisphere of cerebellum; right lobe of thyroid gland; left lobe of thyroid gland; left ovary; body of uterus / Top expressed in: primitive streak; abdominal wall; maxillary prominence; mandibular prominence; medullary collecting duct; renal corpuscle; vas deferens; efferent ductule; hair follicle; ventricular zone; More reference expression data
BioGPS	More reference expression data
Gene ontology
Molecular function	nucleotide binding; helicase activity; protein-containing complex binding; U4 snRNA binding; ATP-dependent protein binding; protein binding; nucleic acid binding; hydrolase activity; ATP binding; U6 snRNA binding; ATP-dependent activity, acting on RNA; ATPase activity; identical protein binding; RNA binding
Cellular component	cytoplasm; transcription export complex; nuclear matrix; U6 snRNP; spliceosomal complex; U4 snRNP; nucleus; nucleoplasm; nuclear speck; nucleolus; protein-containing complex
Biological process	mRNA splicing, via spliceosome; mRNA transport; negative regulation of DNA damage checkpoint; mRNA processing; viral mRNA export from host cell nucleus; positive regulation of translation; mRNA export from nucleus; positive regulation of DNA-templated transcription, elongation; spliceosomal complex assembly; RNA secondary structure unwinding; RNA splicing; positive regulation of DNA biosynthetic process; liver development; positive regulation of cell growth involved in cardiac muscle cell development; positive regulation of vascular associated smooth muscle cell proliferation; mRNA 3'-end processing; termination of RNA polymerase II transcription; RNA export from nucleus; transport
Sources:Amigo / QuickGO
Orthologs
Databases	NCBI: entry; OMA: entry
Species	Human	Mouse
Entrez	7919	53817
Ensembl	ENSG00000198563; ENSG00000225073; ENSG00000237889; ENSG00000229496; ENSG00000215425 ENSG00000235439; ENSG00000225859; ENSG00000230624	ENSMUSG00000019432
UniProt	Q13838	Q9Z1N5
RefSeq (mRNA)	NM_004640; NM_080598	NM_001252457; NM_019693
RefSeq (protein)	NP_004631; NP_542165	NP_001239386; NP_062667
Location (UCSC)	Chr 6: 31.53 – 31.54 Mb	Chr 17: 35.46 – 35.47 Mb
PubMed search
- Wikidata
View/Edit Human	View/Edit Mouse

DExD-box helicase 39B is an enzyme that in humans is encoded by the DDX39B gene (previously BAT1).

This gene encodes a member of the DEAD box family of RNA-dependent ATPases that mediate ATP hydrolysis during pre-mRNA splicing. The encoded protein is an essential splicing factor required for association of U2 small nuclear ribonucleoprotein with pre-mRNA, and also plays an important role in mRNA export from the nucleus to the cytoplasm. A cluster of genes, BAT1-BAT5, is localized in the vicinity of the genes for TNF alpha and TNF beta. These genes are all within the human major histocompatibility complex class III region. Mutations in this gene may be associated with rheumatoid arthritis. Alternatively spliced transcript variants encoding the same protein have been described.

== See also ==
- DDX39
