= NXF2 =

Protein-coding gene in the species Homo sapiens

Identifiers
- Aliases: NXF2, CT39, TAPL-2, TCP11X2, nuclear RNA export factor 2
- External IDs: OMIM: 300315; MGI: 1933192; GeneCards: NXF2

Gene location (Human)
Chr.	X chromosome (human)
Band	Xq22.1	Start	102,247,167 bp
Band	Xq22.1	End	102,326,722 bp

Gene location (Mouse)
Chr.	X chromosome (mouse)
Band	X F1|X 56.31 cM	Start	133,845,275 bp
Band	X F1|X 56.31 cM	End	133,865,503 bp
RNA expression pattern
Bgee	Human / Mouse (ortholog); Top expressed in: testicle; gonad; right testis; left testis; right uterine tube; pituitary gland; anterior pituitary; olfactory zone of nasal mucosa; hypothalamus; islet of Langerhans / Top expressed in: spermatid; Gonadal ridge; embryo; embryo; testicle; spermatocyte; seminiferous tubule; embryo; ganglion of neuraxis; genital tubercle; More reference expression data
BioGPS	n/a
Gene ontology
Molecular function	nucleic acid binding; RNA binding
Cellular component	cytoplasm; nuclear RNA export factor complex; nucleus; nucleoplasm; cytosol
Biological process	multicellular organism development; poly(A)+ mRNA export from nucleus; mRNA transport; RNA transport; mRNA export from nucleus
Sources:Amigo / QuickGO
Orthologs
Databases	NCBI: entry; OMA: entry
Species	Human	Mouse
Entrez	56001	83454
Ensembl	ENSG00000269405	ENSMUSG00000009941
UniProt	Q9GZY0	n/a
RefSeq (mRNA)	NM_022053; NM_001039910; NM_017809	NM_001289735; NM_001289736; NM_031259
RefSeq (protein)	NP_071336; NP_001093156	n/a
Location (UCSC)	Chr X: 102.25 – 102.33 Mb	Chr X: 133.85 – 133.87 Mb
PubMed search
- Wikidata
View/Edit Human	View/Edit Mouse

Nuclear RNA export factor 2 is a protein that in humans is encoded by the NXF2 gene.

== Function ==
This gene is one of a family of nuclear RNA export factor genes. It encodes a protein that is involved in mRNA export, is located in the nucleoplasm, and is associated with the nuclear envelope. Alternative splicing seems to be a common mechanism in this gene family. Two variants have been found for this gene.

== Interactions ==
NXF2 has been shown to interact with NUP214.
