= NXF1 =

Protein-coding gene in the species Homo sapiens

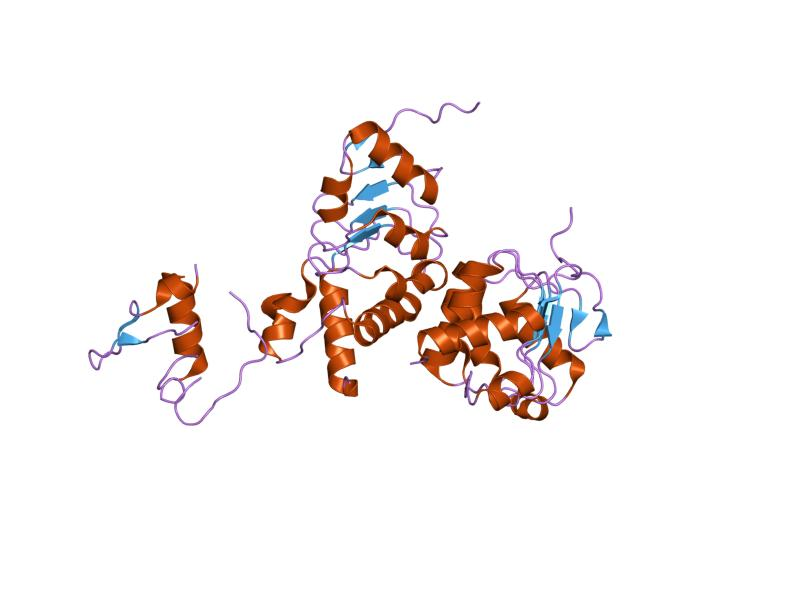
Available structures
PDB	Ortholog search: PDBe RCSB
PDB	List of PDB id codes 4WYK, 1FO1, 1FT8, 1GO5, 1JKG, 1JN5, 1KOH, 1KOO, 1OAI, 2Z5K, 2Z5M, 3RW6, 3RW7

Identifiers
- Aliases: NXF1, MEX67, TAP, nuclear RNA export factor 1
- External IDs: OMIM: 602647; MGI: 1858330; HomoloGene: 38176; GeneCards: NXF1; OMA:NXF1 - orthologs

Gene location (Human)
Chr.	Chromosome 11 (human)
Band	11q12.3	Start	62,792,123 bp
Band	11q12.3	End	62,806,302 bp

Gene location (Mouse)
Chr.	Chromosome 19 (mouse)
Band	19 A|19 5.5 cM	Start	8,734,437 bp
Band	19 A|19 5.5 cM	End	8,748,286 bp
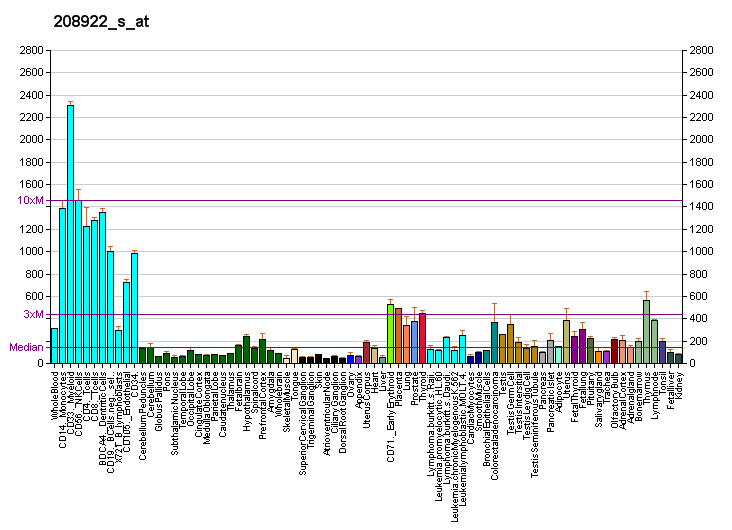

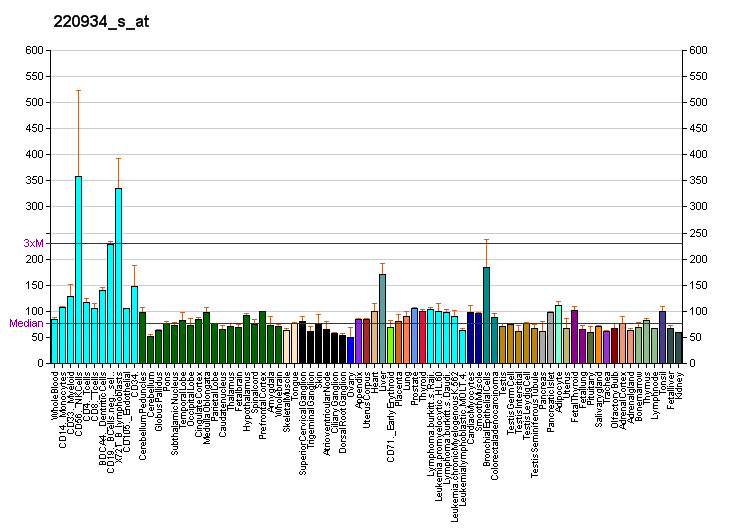
RNA expression pattern
Bgee	Human / Mouse (ortholog); Top expressed in: granulocyte; anterior pituitary; spleen; left lobe of thyroid gland; right lobe of thyroid gland; skin of abdomen; prostate; skin of leg; muscle layer of sigmoid colon; right ovary / Top expressed in: genital tubercle; tail of embryo; spermatocyte; spermatid; ventricular zone; thymus; condyle; saccule; fossa; epiblast; More reference expression data
BioGPS	More reference expression data
Gene ontology
Molecular function	protein binding; single-stranded RNA binding; mRNA binding; structural constituent of nuclear pore; nucleic acid binding; RNA binding
Cellular component	cytoplasm; cytosol; nuclear speck; transcription export complex; nuclear pore; intracellular anatomical structure; nuclear inclusion body; nucleus; nucleoplasm; nuclear envelope
Biological process	mRNA transport; mRNA export from nucleus; poly(A)+ mRNA export from nucleus; viral process; RNA export from nucleus; transport; protein transport
Sources:Amigo / QuickGO
Orthologs
Species	Human	Mouse
Entrez	10482	53319
Ensembl	ENSG00000162231	ENSMUSG00000010097
UniProt	Q9UBU9	Q99JX7
RefSeq (mRNA)	NM_006362; NM_001081491	NM_001276704; NM_016813
RefSeq (protein)	NP_001074960; NP_006353	NP_001263633; NP_058093
Location (UCSC)	Chr 11: 62.79 – 62.81 Mb	Chr 19: 8.73 – 8.75 Mb
PubMed search
- Wikidata
View/Edit Human	View/Edit Mouse

Nuclear RNA export factor 1, also known as NXF1 or TAP, is a protein which in humans is encoded by the NXF1 gene.

== Function ==
This gene is one member of a family of nuclear RNA export factor genes. Common domain features of this family are a noncanonical RNP-type RNA-binding domain (RBD), 4 leucine-rich repeats (LRRs), a nuclear transport factor 2 (NTF2)-like domain that allows heterodimerization with NTF2-related export protein-1 (NXT1), and a ubiquitin-associated domain that mediates interactions with nucleoporins. Alternative splicing results in transcript variants. The LRRs and NTF2-like domains are required for export activity. The encoded protein of this gene shuttles between the nucleus and the cytoplasm and binds in vivo to poly(A)+ RNA. It is the vertebrate homologue of the yeast protein Mex67p. The encoded protein overcomes the mRNA export block caused by the presence of saturating amounts of CTE (constitutive transport element) RNA of type D retroviruses. A variant allele of the homologous Nxf1 gene in mice suppresses a class of mutations caused by integration of an endogenous retrovirus (intracisternal A particle) into an intron.

== Interactions ==
NXF1 has been shown to interact with TNPO2, MAGOH, U2 small nuclear RNA auxiliary factor 1, DHX9, HuD and NUP214.

== Tap protein ==
In molecular biology, another name for the protein NXF1 is TAP. In particular this entry focuses on the C-terminal domain, which also contains the UBA (protein domain).

TAP_C
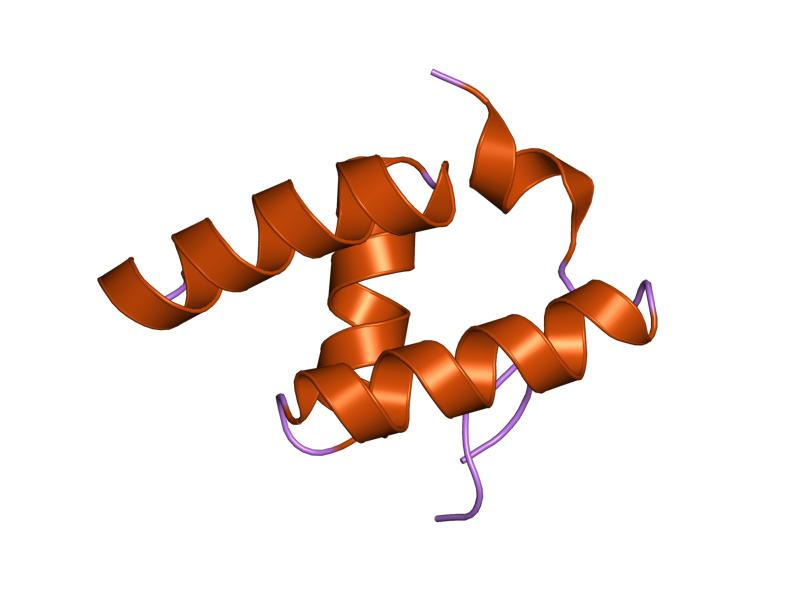
- complex between tap uba domain and fxfg nucleoporin peptide

Identifiers
- Symbol: TAP_C
- Pfam: PF03943
- Pfam clan: CL0214
- InterPro: IPR005637
- SCOP2: 1go5 / SCOPe / SUPFAM
Available protein structures:
- PDB: IPR005637 PF03943 (ECOD; PDBsum)
- AlphaFold: IPR005637; PF03943

This entry contains the NXF family of shuttling transport receptors for nuclear export of mRNA, which include:

- vertebrate mRNA export factor TAP or nuclear RNA export factor 1 (NXF1).
- Caenorhabditis elegans nuclear RNA export factor 1 (nxf-1).
- yeast mRNA export factor MEX67. Members of the NXF family have a modular structure. A nuclear localization sequence and a noncanonical RNA recognition motif (RRM) (see PROSITEDOC) followed by four LRR repeats are located in its N-terminal half. The C-terminal half contains a NTF2 domain (see [href="http://expasy.org/prosite/PDOC50177 PROSITEDOC]) followed by a second domain, TAP-C. The TAP-C domain is important for binding to FG repeat-containing nuclear pore proteins (FG-nucleoporins) and is sufficient to mediate nuclear shuttling.

The Tap-C domain is made of four alpha helices packed against each other. The arrangement of helices 1, 2 and 3 is similar to that seen in a UBA fold. and is joined to the next module by flexible 12-residue Pro-rich linker.

== Function ==
Nuclear export of mRNAs is mediated by the Tap protein.

== Structure ==
Tap can form a multimeric complex with itself and with other members of the NXF family. Three functional domains of Tap have been well characterized: the RNA-binding domain, the Nuclear Transport Factor 2 (NTF2)-like domain, and the ubiquitin-associated (UBA) domain.
