= DDX39 =

Protein-coding gene in the species Homo sapiens

DDX39A
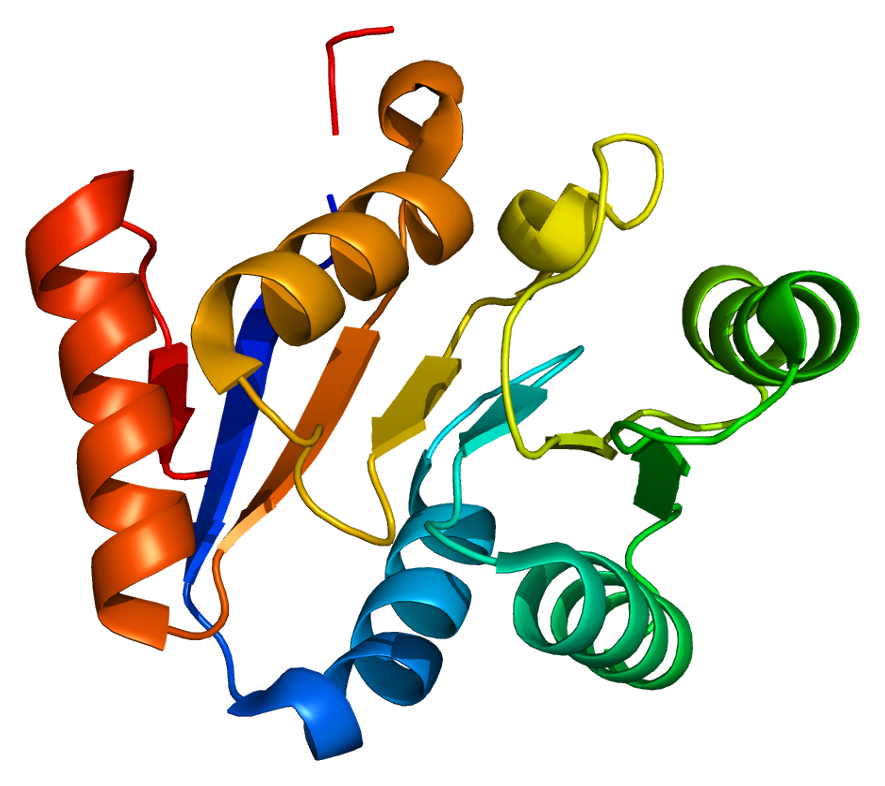

Identifiers
- Aliases: DDX39A, BAT1, BAT1L, DDX39, DDXL, URH49, DEAD-box helicase 39A, DExD-box helicase 39A
- External IDs: MGI: 1915528; GeneCards: DDX39A
Enzyme activity
EC #	BRENDA	ExPASy	KEGG	MetaCyc
3.6.4.13	↗	↗	↗	↗

Gene location (Human)
Chr.	Chromosome 19 (human)
Band	19p13.12	Start	14,408,798 bp
Band	19p13.12	End	14,419,383 bp

Gene location (Mouse)
Chr.	Chromosome 8 (mouse)
Band	8|8 C2	Start	84,441,806 bp
Band	8|8 C2	End	84,453,521 bp
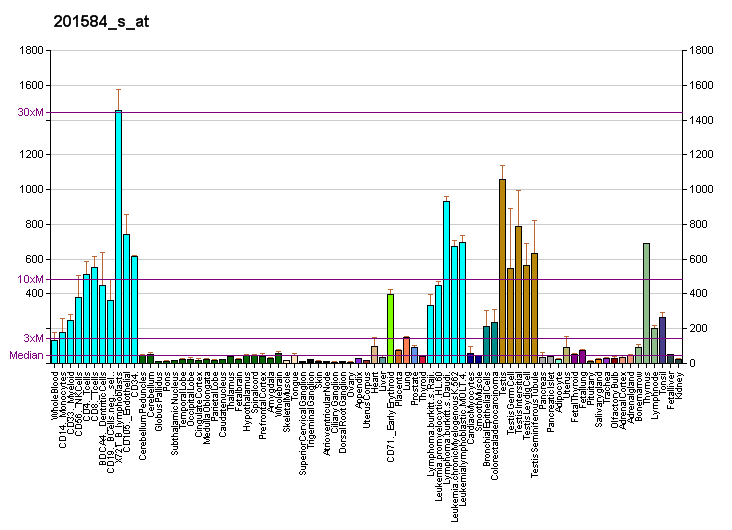
RNA expression pattern
Bgee	Human / Mouse (ortholog); Top expressed in: left testis; right testis; granulocyte; ventricular zone; spleen; lymph node; mucosa of transverse colon; appendix; ganglionic eminence; upper lobe of left lung / Top expressed in: primitive streak; Paneth cell; endothelial cell of lymphatic vessel; hair follicle; abdominal wall; otic placode; medullary collecting duct; migratory enteric neural crest cell; epiblast; condyle; More reference expression data
BioGPS	More reference expression data
Gene ontology
Molecular function	helicase activity; nucleotide binding; protein binding; nucleic acid binding; hydrolase activity; ATP binding; ATPase activity; identical protein binding; RNA binding
Cellular component	membrane; spliceosomal complex; cytoplasm; nucleus; nucleoplasm; nuclear speck; nucleolus
Biological process	RNA splicing; mRNA splicing, via spliceosome; mRNA processing; mRNA export from nucleus; cellular response to DNA damage stimulus; RNA secondary structure unwinding; regulation of gene expression; RNA export from nucleus; termination of RNA polymerase II transcription; mRNA 3'-end processing
Sources:Amigo / QuickGO
Orthologs
Databases	NCBI: entry; OMA: entry
Species	Human	Mouse
Entrez	10212	68278
Ensembl	ENSG00000123136	ENSMUSG00000005481
UniProt	O00148	Q8VDW0
RefSeq (mRNA)	NM_001204057; NM_005804; NM_138998	NM_197982; NM_001363116; NM_001363117
RefSeq (protein)	NP_005795	NP_932099; NP_001350045; NP_001350046
Location (UCSC)	Chr 19: 14.41 – 14.42 Mb	Chr 8: 84.44 – 84.45 Mb
PubMed search
- Wikidata
View/Edit Human	View/Edit Mouse

ATP-dependent RNA helicase DDX39 is an enzyme that in humans is encoded by the DDX39 gene.

This gene encodes a member of the DEAD box protein family. These proteins are characterized by the conserved motif Asp-Glu-Ala-Asp (DEAD) and are putative RNA helicases. They are implicated in a number of cellular processes involving alteration of RNA secondary structure, such as translation initiation, nuclear and mitochondrial splicing, and ribosome and spliceosome assembly. Based on their distribution patterns, some members of the DEAD box protein family are believed to be involved in embryogenesis, spermatogenesis, and cellular growth and division.

== Clinical significance ==
Disorders of this enzyme are caused by a missense of the gene and can result in developmental delay, hypotonia, short stature, and variable neurological presentation

== See also ==
- DDX39B
