= NXT1 =

Protein-coding gene in the species Homo sapiens

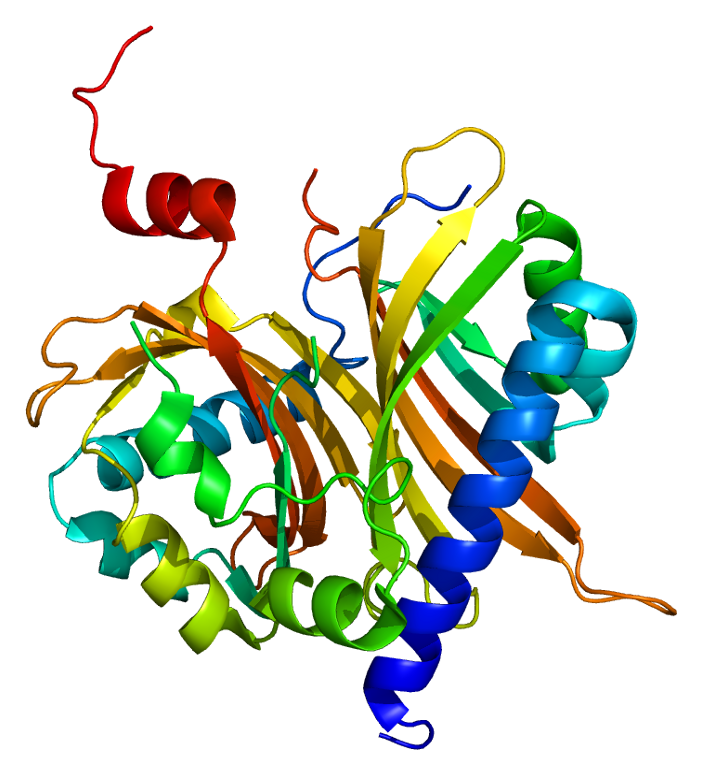
Available structures
PDB	Ortholog search: PDBe RCSB
PDB	List of PDB id codes 1JKG, 1JN5, 4WYK

Identifiers
- Aliases: NXT1, MTR2, P15, nuclear transport factor 2 like export factor 1
- External IDs: OMIM: 605811; MGI: 1929619; HomoloGene: 8301; GeneCards: NXT1; OMA:NXT1 - orthologs

Gene location (Human)
Chr.	Chromosome 20 (human)
Band	20p11.21	Start	23,350,791 bp
Band	20p11.21	End	23,354,771 bp

Gene location (Mouse)
Chr.	Chromosome 2 (mouse)
Band	2|2 G3	Start	148,514,521 bp
Band	2|2 G3	End	148,517,947 bp
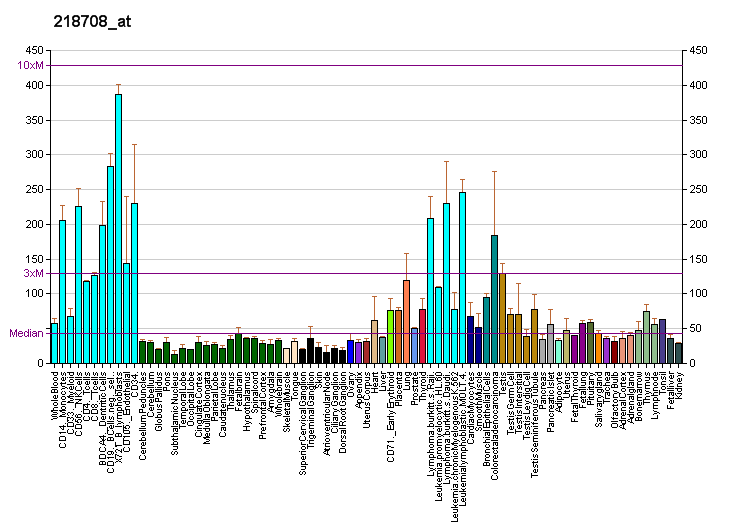
RNA expression pattern
Bgee	Human / Mouse (ortholog); Top expressed in: left uterine tube; popliteal artery; tibial arteries; mucosa of urinary bladder; olfactory zone of nasal mucosa; ascending aorta; left ovary; granulocyte; cartilage tissue; skin of abdomen / Top expressed in: spermatocyte; seminiferous tubule; spermatid; embryo; embryo; medullary collecting duct; epiblast; renal corpuscle; maxillary prominence; primary oocyte; More reference expression data
BioGPS	More reference expression data
Gene ontology
Molecular function	protein binding
Cellular component	nucleus; nuclear speck; nuclear pore; nucleoplasm; cytoplasm; cytosol; nuclear pore central transport channel
Biological process	protein export from nucleus; protein transport; RNA export from nucleus; mRNA export from nucleus; protein import into nucleus; nucleocytoplasmic transport
Sources:Amigo / QuickGO
Orthologs
Species	Human	Mouse
Entrez	29107	56488
Ensembl	ENSG00000132661	ENSMUSG00000036992
UniProt	Q9UKK6	Q9QZV9
RefSeq (mRNA)	NM_013248	NM_001110159; NM_019761
RefSeq (protein)	NP_037380	NP_001103629; NP_062735
Location (UCSC)	Chr 20: 23.35 – 23.35 Mb	Chr 2: 148.51 – 148.52 Mb
PubMed search
- Wikidata
View/Edit Human	View/Edit Mouse

NTF2-related export protein 1 is a protein that in humans is encoded by the NXT1 gene.

The protein encoded by this gene is located in the nuclear envelope. It has protein similarity to nuclear transport factor 2. This protein functions as a nuclear export factor in RAN (Ras-related nuclear protein)- and CRM1 (required for chromosome region maintenance)-dependent pathways. It is found to stimulate the export of U1 snRNA in RAN- and CRM1-dependent pathways and the export of tRNA and mRNA in a CRM1-independent pathway. The encoded protein heterodimerizes with Tap protein and may regulate the ability of Tap protein to mediate nuclear mRNA export. The use of alternate polyadenylation sites has been found for this gene.
