= HEARO RNA motif =

HNH Endonuclease-Associated RNA and ORF (HEARO) RNAs conform to a conserved RNA structure that was identified in bacteria by bioinformatics. HEARO RNAs average roughly 300 nucleotides, which is comparable to the size of many ribozymes, which catalyze chemical reactions.

Multiple lines of non-experimental evidence suggest that HEARO RNAs form part of a mobile genetic element. HEARO RNAs contain an open reading frame (ORF) that usually codes for a protein containing an HNH endonuclease domain. Members of this family of endonucleases are often used by mobile genetic elements, such as group I and group II introns, to facilitate their replication. Several instances were detected of homologous sequences where only one sequence contains the HEARO element, suggesting that the HEARO element might have integrated into an ancestor of this sequence. Such cases also suggest that HEARO elements integrate 5′ to ATGA or GTGA sequences, although no other integration requirements were elucidated. Additional analysis was consistent with the hypothesis of self replication.

Subsequent work found that the predicted HNH endonucleases associated with HEARO RNAs are IscB proteins, and function as DNA endonucleases that use an RNA molecule to determine where cleavage occurs. Thus, they are similar to CRISPR-Cas systems, and the IscB proteins is thought to be evolutionarily related to Cas12 proteins in certain CRISPR-Cas systems. A part of the HEARO RNA motif was called the omega-RNA, and is required for the CRISPR-Cas-like activity of the system. The function of the remaining part of HEARO RNA motif remains unknown. Earlier work noted the similarity between the putative HNH endonuclease proteins and those associated with IS605 elements. This analysis pointed out that IS605 elements often use short single-stranded DNA elements, but that these elements are much smaller than the full HEARO RNA motif.

The Rfam model of HEARO RNAs uses only the region that is 5′ to the ORF. This region includes the bulk of the structure, but does not include a hairpin located 3′ to the ORF.
