= VS ribozyme =

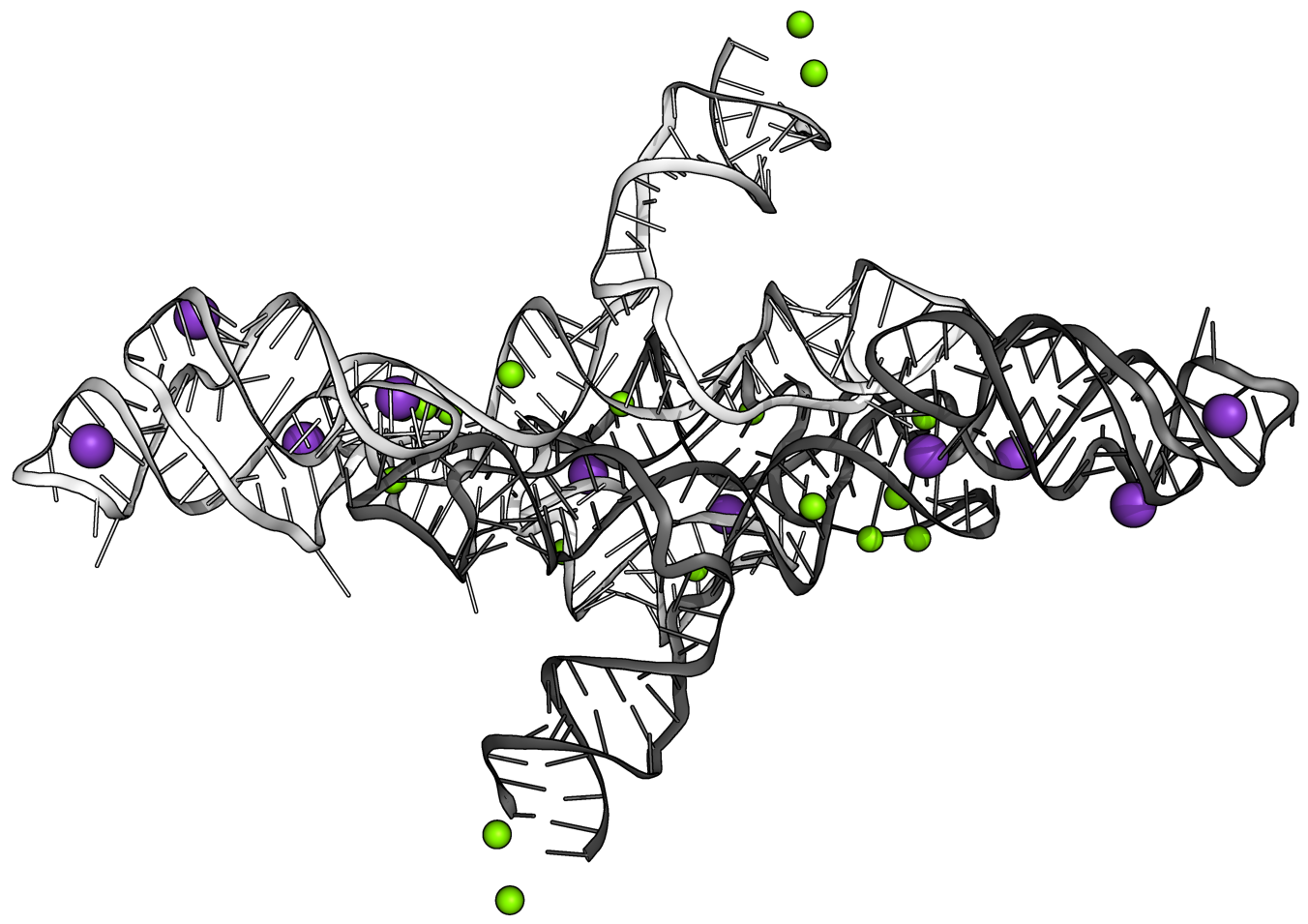
A dimer of the VS ribozyme from Neurospora. Monomer 1 in white, monomer 2 in grey. Magnesium ions in green, potassium ions in purple. (PDB: 4r4v)

The Varkud satellite (VS) ribozyme is an RNA enzyme that carries out the cleavage of a phosphodiester bond.

== Introduction ==
Varkud satellite (VS) ribozyme is the largest known nucleolytic ribozyme and is embedded in VS RNA. VS RNA is a long non-coding RNA that exists as a satellite RNA and is found in mitochondria of Varkud-1C and a few other strains of Neurospora. VS ribozyme contains features of both catalytic RNAs and group 1 introns. VS ribozyme has both cleavage and ligation activity and can perform both cleavage and ligation reactions efficiently in the absence of proteins. VS ribozyme undergoes horizontal gene transfer with other Neurospora strains. VS ribozymes have nothing in common with other nucleolytic ribozymes.

VS RNA has a unique primary, secondary, and tertiary structure. The secondary structure of the VS ribozyme consists of six helical domains (Figure 1). Stem-loop I forms the substrate domain while stem-loop II-VI forms the catalytic domain. When these 2 domains are synthesized in vitro separately, they can perform the self-cleavage reaction by trans-acting The substrate binds into a cleft which is made by two helices. The likely active site of the ribozyme is a very important nucleotide A756. The A730 loop and A756 nucleotide are critical to its function since they participate in the phosphoric transfer chemistry activity of the ribozyme

== Origin ==
VS RNA is transcribed as a multimeric transcript from VS DNA. VS DNA contains a region coding reverse transcriptase necessary for replication of the VS RNA. Once transcribed, VS RNA undergoes a site-specific cleavage. VS RNA self-cleaves at a specific phosphodiester bond to produce a monomeric transcript and a few multimeric transcripts. These transcripts then undergo a self-ligation and form a circular VS RNA. This circular VS RNA is the predominant form of VS found in Neurospora. VS ribozyme is a small catalytic motif embedded within this circular VS RNA. The majority of VS RNA is made up of 881 nucleotides.

== Structure ==
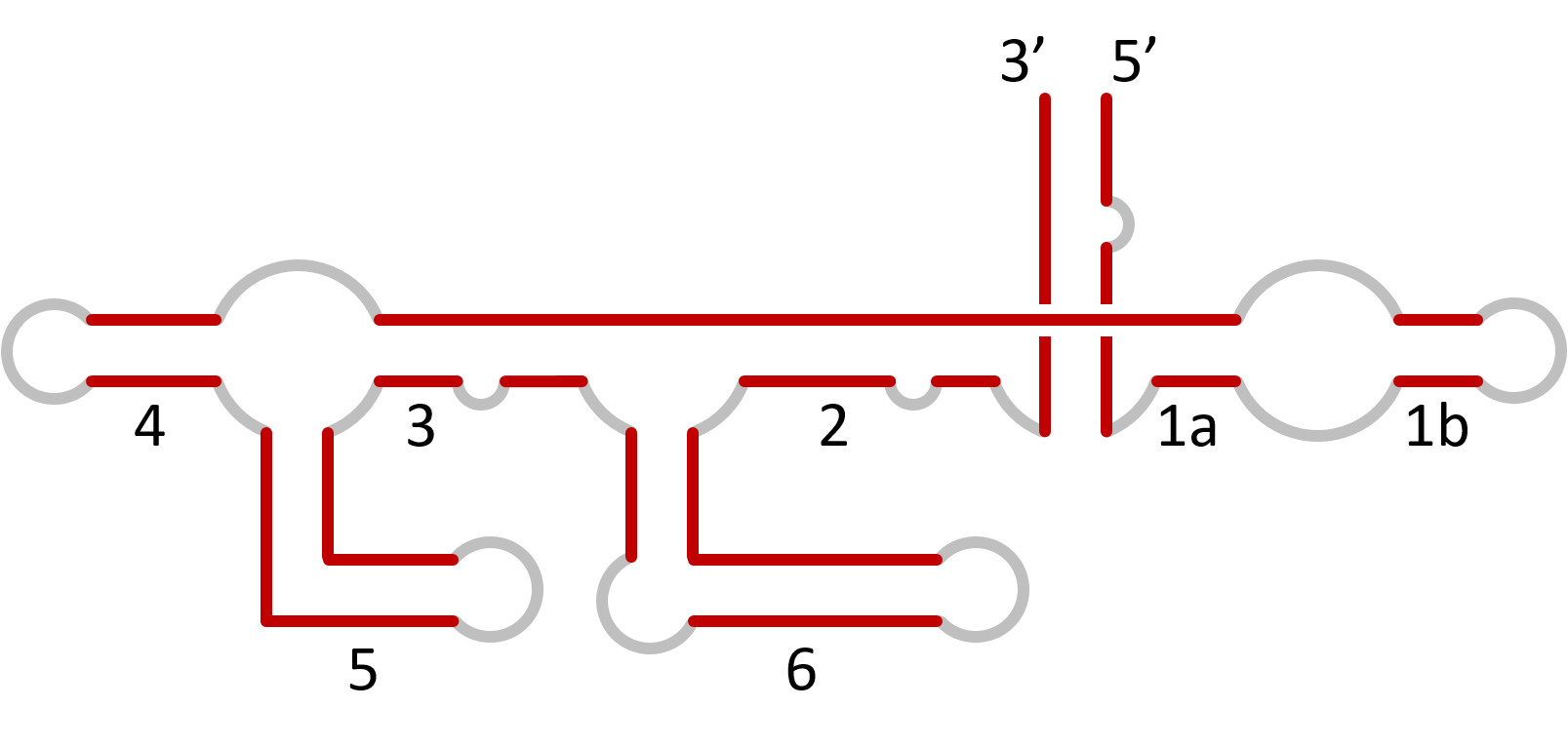
Secondary structure of VS ribozyme. Loops numbered, with base-paired helices in red.

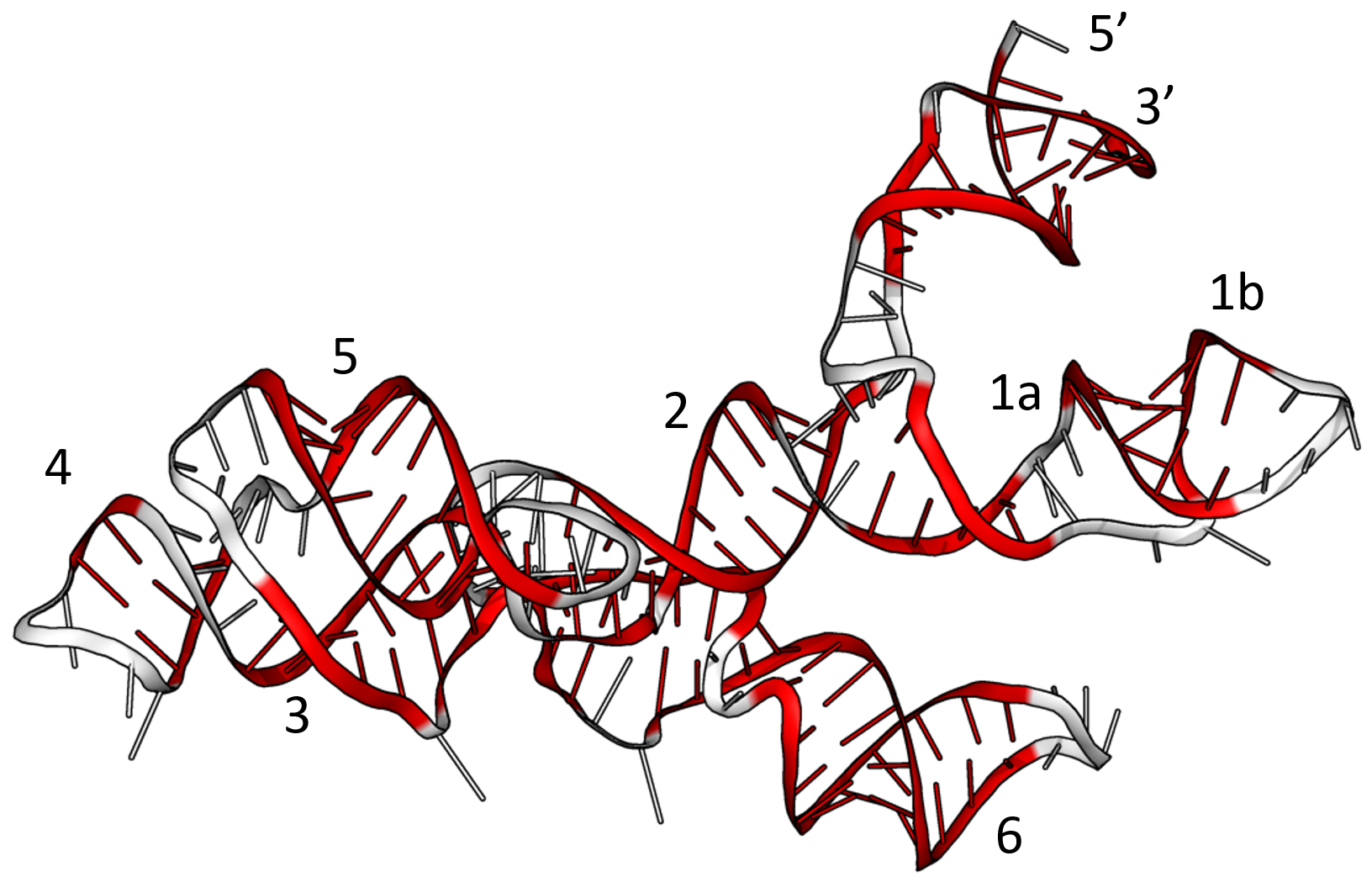
Tertiary structure of VS ribozyme. Loops numbered, with base-paired helices in red. (PDB: 4r4v)

In the natural state, a VS ribozyme motif contains 154 nucleotides that fold into six helices. Its RNA contains a self-cleavage element, which is thought to act in the processing of intermediates made during replication. The H-shaped structure of the ribozyme is organised by two three-way junctions, which determine the overall fold of the ribozyme. A unique feature of the structure of ribozyme is that even if the majority of helix IV and the distal end of helix VI were deleted, there would be no significant loss of activity. However, if the lengths of helices III and V were to be changed, there would be a major loss of activity. The base bulges of the ribozyme, helices II and IV, have very important structural roles since replacing them with other nucleotides does not affect their activity. Basically, the VS ribozyme's activity is very dependent on the local sequence of the two three-way junctions. The three-way junction present in the VS ribozyme is very similar to the one seen in the small (23S) subunit of rRNA.

== Active site ==
The active sites of the ribozyme can be found in the helical junctions, the bulges and the lengths of the critical helices those being III and V. There is one important area found in the internal loop of helix VI called A730, a single base change in this loop would lead to decreased loss of cleavage activity but no significant changes in the folding of the ribozyme occur. Other mutations which affect the activity of the ribozyme are methylation, suppression of thiophilic Manganese ions at the A730 site.

== Possible catalytic mechanism ==
The A730 loop is very important in the catalytic activity of the ribozyme. The ribozyme functions like a docking station where it will dock the substrate into the cleft between helices II and VI to facilitate an interaction between the cleavage site and the A730 loop. This interaction makes an environment in which catalysis can proceed in a way similar to interactions seen in the hairpin ribozyme. Within the A730 loop, a substitution of A756 by G, C, or U will lead to a 300-fold loss of cleavage and ligation activity.

The proof that the A730 loop is the active site of the VS ribozyme is very evident, and that A756 plays an important role in its activity. The cleavage reaction works by an S_{N}2 reaction mechanism. The nucleophilic attack of the 2’-oxygen on the 3’-phosphate will create a cyclic 2’3’ phosphate by the 5’-oxygen leaving. The ligation reaction occurs in reverse in which the 5’-oxygen attacks the 3’-phosphate of the cyclic phosphate. The way that both of these reactions are facilitated is by general acid-base catalysis which strengthen the oxygen nucleophile by removing bonded proteins and stabilizing the oxyanion leaving groups through protonation. It is also important to add that if a group is behaving as a base in the cleavage reaction, then it must act as an acid in the ligation reaction. Solvated metal ions act in general acid-base catalysis, where the metal ions might act as a Lewis acid which polarize phosphate oxygen atoms. Another important factor in the rate of ligation reaction is the pH dependence, which corresponds to a pKa of 5.6, which is not a factor in the cleavage reaction. This particular dependence requires a protonated base at position A756 of the ribozyme.

Another proposed catalytic strategy is the stabilisation of a pentavalent phosphate of the reaction transition state. This mechanism would probably involve the formation of hydrogen bonds as seen in the hairpin ribozyme Furthermore, the proximity of active site groups to each other and their orientation in space would contribute to the catalytic mechanism taking place. This might bring the transition state and the substrate closer for the legation reaction to occur.

== Catalysts ==
Very high concentrations of bivalent and monovalent cations increase the efficiency of the cleavage reaction. These cations facilitate the base pairing of the ribozyme with the substrate. VS cleavage rate can be accelerated by high cation concentration as well as by increasing RNA concentration. Therefore, a low concentration of any of these is rate-limiting. The cations' role is considered to be the neutralisation of charge during RNA folding rather than catalysis.

== Hypothesis for evolution ==
1. A molecular fossil of RNA world which has retained both cleavage and ligation functions.

2. VS Ribozyme later acquired one or more of its enzymatic activities.

RNA-mediated cleavage and ligation are found in group 1 and group 2 self-splicing RNAs. VS RNA contains many conserved sequence characteristics to group 1 introns. However, the VS ribozyme splice site is different from the group 1 intron splice site, and the VR ribozyme self-cleaving site is outside of the core of the group 1 intron. In the cleavage reaction, the VS ribozyme produces 2’,3’-cyclic phosphate, and the group 1 introns produce 3’-hydroxyl. Functional similarity with group 1 introns and then mechanistically being different from the introns support this hypothesis that the VS ribozyme is a chimaera formed by the insertion of a novel catalytic RNA into group 1 introns.
