= COG2827 RNA motif =

COG2827
- Consensus secondary structure and sequence conservation of COG2827 RNA

Identifiers
- Symbol: COG2827
- Rfam: RF02938

Other data
- RNA type: Gene; sRNA
- SO: SO:0001263
- PDB structures: PDBe

The COG2827 RNA motif is a conserved RNA structure that was discovered by bioinformatics. COG2827 motifs are found in Clostridiales.

It is ambiguous whether COG2827 RNAs function as cis-regulatory elements or whether they operate in trans. Most COG2827 RNAs occur upstream of genes encoding GIY-YIG endonucleases. Although these genes are often located inside self-splicing introns, the COG2827 RNA motif is much smaller and simpler than known self-splicing introns, and is therefore unlikely to function as a ribozyme.
