= Group III =

Group III may refer to:

== Chemistry ==
In the periodic table Group III formerly included these:

- Group 13 elements: boron (B), aluminium (Al), gallium (Ga), indium (In), thallium (Tl).
- Group 3 elements: scandium (Sc) and yttrium (Y) plus the lanthanide and actinide series elements.

== Biology ==
- The dsRNA viruses (e.g. Rotavirus) according to the Baltimore classification.
- Group III introns, a class of introns found in mRNA genes of chloroplasts in euglenoid protists.

== Other ==
- Group III motor oil base stock as classified by the American Petroleum Institute
