= LTRA =

LTRA may refer to:

- Land Tenure Reform Association
- Leukotriene receptor antagonist
- Long term response action
- LtrA, open reading frame
