= Pseudomonadales-1 RNA motif =

Pseudomonadales-1
- Consensus secondary structure and sequence conservation of Pseudomonadales-1 RNA

Identifiers
- Symbol: Pseudomonadales-1
- Rfam: RF03046

Other data
- RNA type: Gene; sRNA
- SO: SO:0001263
- PDB structures: PDBe

The Pseudomonadales-1 RNA motif is a conserved RNA structure that was discovered by bioinformatics. The Pseudomonadales-1 motif often exhibits an apparent sarcin-ricin loop, a type internal loop common in RNA. Pseudomonadales-1 motif RNAs are found in relatively closely related species of Pseudomonadales. Despite this narrow distribution, the Pseudomonadales-1 RNA motif does not exhibit many invariant nucleotide positions, suggesting that it does not need to be highly conserved at the primary sequence level.

Pseudomonadales-1 RNAs likely function in trans as small RNAs, as no consistent pattern of associated protein-coding genes is observed.
