= GlmS glucosamine-6-phosphate activated ribozyme =

glmS glucosamine-6-phosphate activated ribozyme
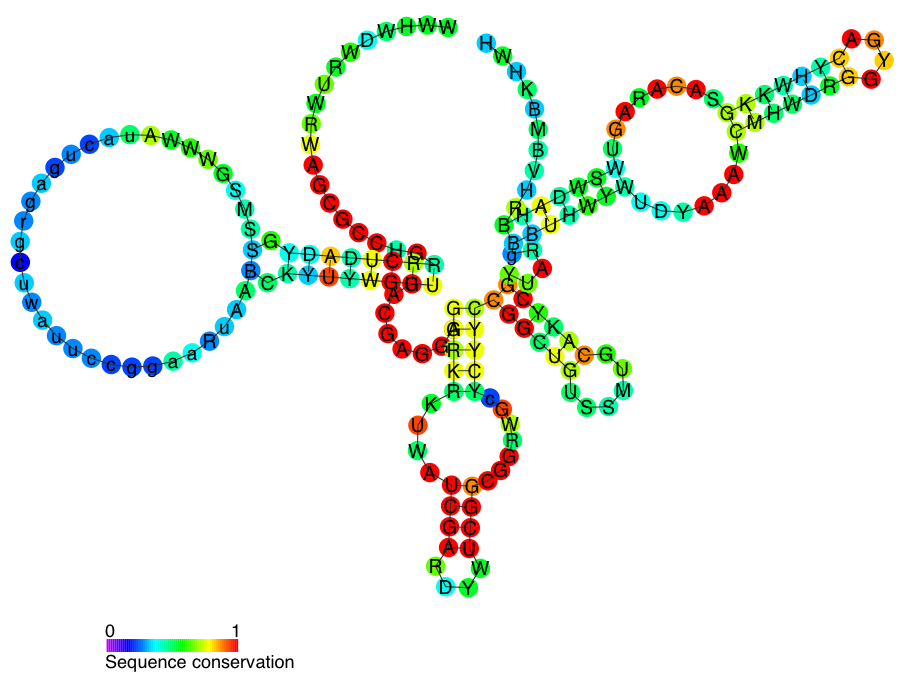
- Predicted secondary structure and sequence conservation of glmS

Identifiers
- Symbol: glmS
- Rfam: RF00234

Other data
- RNA type: Cis-reg; riboswitch
- Domain(s): Bacteria
- SO: SO:0000035
- PDB structures: PDBe

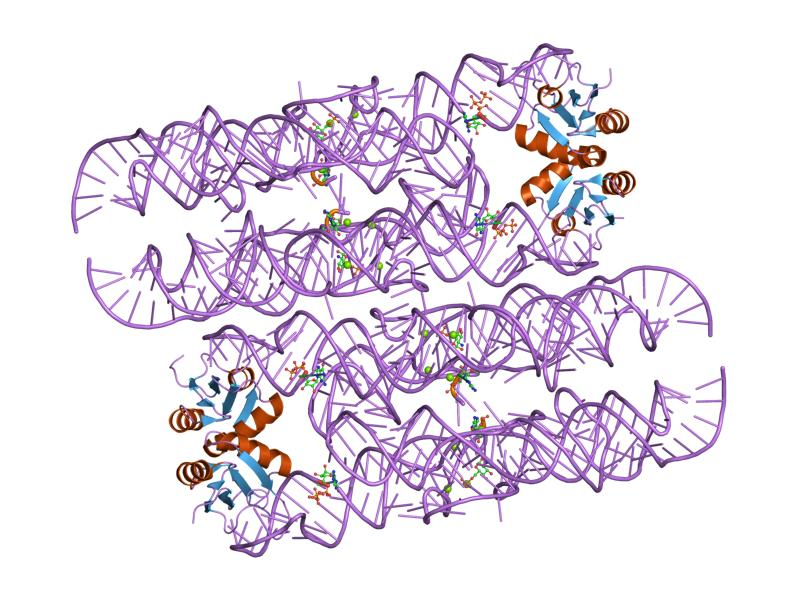
A 3D representation of the GlmS ribozyme. This is a view of the GlmS ribozyme bound to its catalytic cofactor.

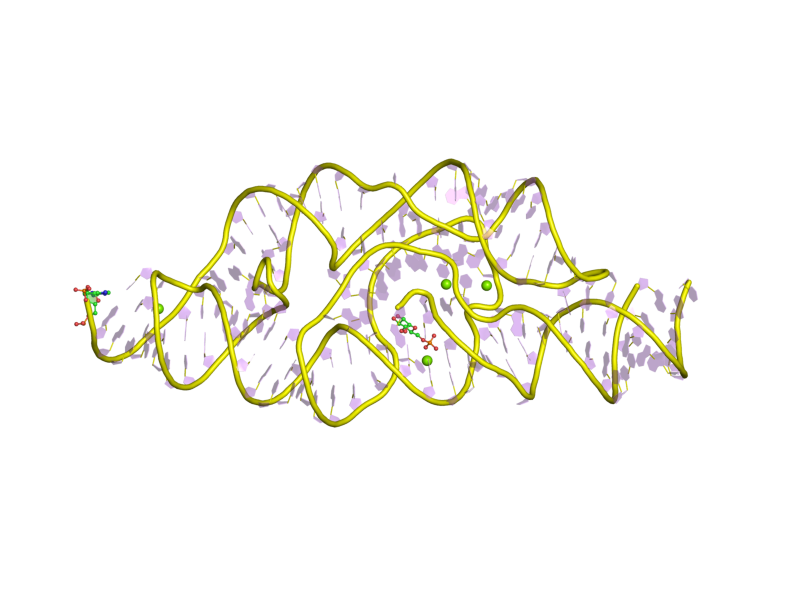
A 3D representation of the GlmS ribozyme. This view shows the pre-cleavage state of the Thermoanaerobacter tengcongensis glmS ribozyme bound to glucose-6-phosphate.

The glucosamine-6-phosphate riboswitch ribozyme ( glmS ribozyme) is an RNA structure that resides in the 5' untranslated region (UTR) of the mRNA transcript of the glmS gene. This RNA regulates the glmS gene by responding to concentrations of a specific metabolite, glucosamine-6-phosphate (GlcN6P), in addition to catalyzing a self-cleaving chemical reaction upon activation. This cleavage leads to the degradation of the mRNA that contains the ribozyme, and lowers production of GlcN6P. The glmS gene encodes for an enzyme glutamine-fructose-6-phosphate amidotransferase, which catalyzes the formation of GlcN6P, a compound essential for cell wall biosynthesis, from fructose-6-phosphate and glutamine. Thus, when GlcN6P levels are high, the glmS ribozyme is activated and the mRNA transcript is degraded, but in the absence of GlcN6P, the gene continues to be translated into glutamine-fructose-6-phosphate amidotransferase and GlcN6P is produced. GlcN6P is a cofactor for this cleavage reaction, as it directly participates as an acid-base catalyst. This RNA is the first riboswitch also found to be a self-cleaving ribozyme and, like many others, was discovered using a bioinformatics approach.

== Structure ==
The structure of the glmS ribozyme was first determined by X-ray crystallography in 2006. The tertiary structure of this RNA is characterized by three coaxial stacked helices, packed side by side. The ribozyme core contains a double pseudoknotted structure, which places the central helix P2.1 such that the scissile phosphate is nestled by the major groove. The major groove of the adjacent helix P2.2 is involved in metabolite binding and the scissile phosphate is attached to the 5' end of the helix. The roof of the active site is characterized by conserved base triples, which connect P2.1 and P2.2 stacks and the floor consists of a non-conserved G-U pair, which are splayed apart. By examining superimposition of ribozyme structures in a pre-cleavage state, metabolite bound state and post cleavage state, it was determined there is no gross conformational change upon metabolite binding, which is indicative of a preorganized active site that depends on GlcN6P as a cofactor, not an allosteric activator. The cofactor is bound in a solvent-accessible pocket and the structure suggests that the amine group of GlcN6P is involved in the catalytic process.

== Cleavage Requirements ==
Although glmS ribozyme performs self-cleavage upon binding GlcN6P, the glmS ribozyme active site does not undergo conformational change upon binding GlcN6P. Instead, the active site is pre-formed and glmS ribozyme activity is triggered by the introduction of a functional group on GlcN6P that is necessary for catalysis. As mentioned above, the amine group on GlcN6P is thought to be the catalytically involved functional group, which is supported by studies that evaluated glmS ribozyme activity using different ligands, under physiologic conditions. For example, these experiments found that incubation with Glc6P (no amine group) inhibits glmS self-cleavage while incubation with GlcN (available amine group) stimulates cleavage, though not to the extent that GlcN6P does. These and other findings indicate that the glmS ribozyme is a unique class of ribozyme, and that its discovery is further evidence of the catalytic capacity of RNA.
