= Leadzyme =

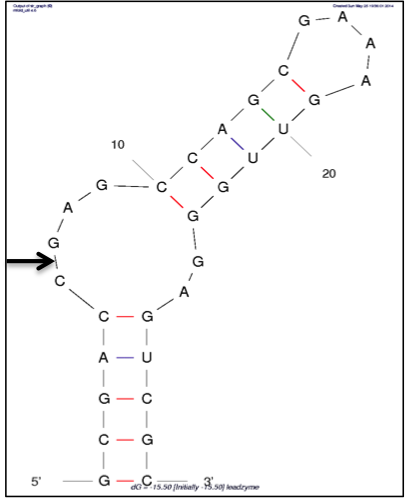
Secondary structure of a leadzyme sequence obtained using mfold. It consists of an asymmetric internal loop made up of six nucleotides.The arrow indicates the cleavage site.

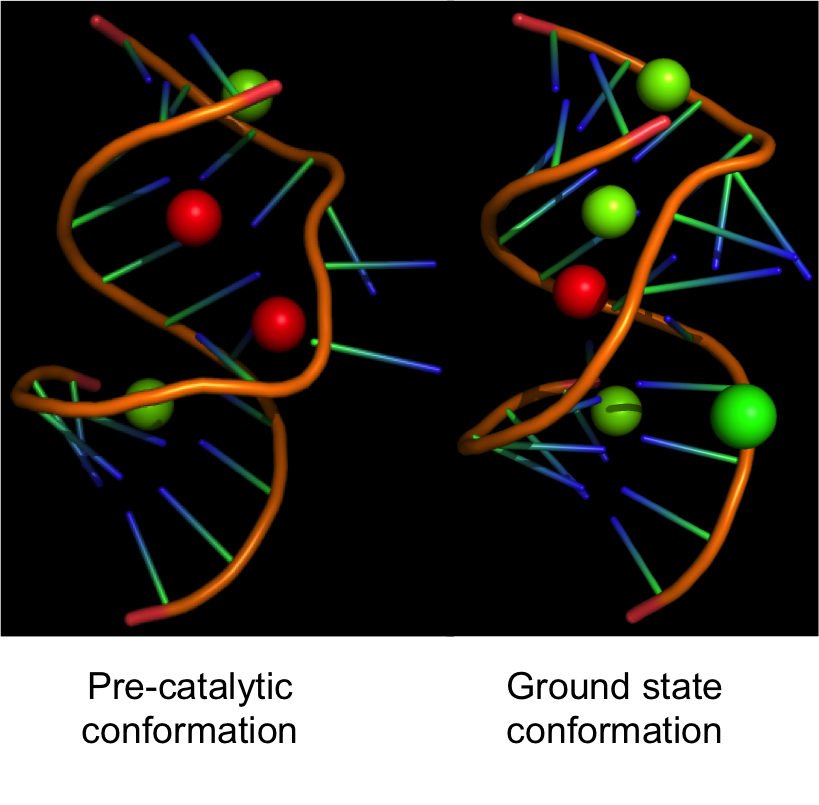
The figure shows cartoon representations of the ground and pre-catalytic conformations of leadzyme. The green spheres represent Mg^{2+} ions and the red spheres represent Sr2+ ions.Figure rendered in pymol using coordinates from pdb file 1NUV.

Leadzyme is a small ribozyme (catalytic RNA), which catalyzes the cleavage of a specific phosphodiester bond. It was discovered using an in-vitro evolution study where the researchers were selecting for RNAs that specifically cleaved themselves in the presence of lead. However, since then, it has been discovered in several natural systems. Leadzyme was found to be efficient and dynamic in the presence of micromolar concentrations of lead ions. Unlike in other small self-cleaving ribozymes, other divalent metal ions cannot replace Pb^{2+} in the leadzyme. Due to obligatory requirement for a lead, the ribozyme is called a metalloribozyme.

Leadzyme has been subjected to extensive biochemical and structural characterization. The minimal secondary structure of leadzyme is surprisingly very simple . It comprises an asymmetric internal loop composed of six nucleotides and a helical region on each side of the internal loop. The cleavage site of leadzyme is located within a four-nucleotide long asymmetric internal loop that also consists of RNA helices on its both sides. This is shown in top figure on right, which is the secondary structure of leadzyme generated using mfold. The structures of leadzyme have also been solved using X-ray crystallography and NMR. The crystal structures of the two conformations of leadzyme are shown in the lower figure on right.

== Catalytic mechanism of leadzyme ==
Leadzyme is thought to perform catalysis using a two-step mechanism. In the first step of the reaction, the phosphodiester bond is cleaved into two products: 5' product terminating in 2'3' cyclic phosphate and the 3' product in 5' hydroxyl. This step is similar to other small self-cleaving ribozymes such as the Hammerhead ribozyme and HDV ribozyme. Both of those ribozymes generate a product, which contain a 2', 3' -cyclic phosphate. However, in leadzyme this product is just an intermediate. In the second step of this reaction pathway, the 2' 3' -cyclic phosphate undergoes hydrolysis to form 3' monophosphate. This mode of catalysis is similar to how ribonucleases (proteins) function rather than any known small self-cleaving ribozyme.

The leadzyme is thought to have a highly dynamic structure. Many studies including NMR, X-ray crystallography and molecular modeling have revealed slightly different structures. Recently using time-resolved spectroscopy, it was shown that the active site of leadzyme is very dynamic. It samples a lot of different conformations in solution and that the delta G of the interconversion between different conformations is very low. Consistent with these studies, a high-resolution crystal structure also revealed two distinct conformations of the leadzyme with different binding sites for Mg^{2+} and Sr^{2+} (Pb^{2+} substitutes) in the two conformations. In the ground state, leadzyme binds a single Sr^{2+} ion at nucleotides G43, G45 and A45. This binding site is away from the scissile bond (cleavage site) and thus does not explain the involvement of the Pb^{2+} in the catalysis. However, in the second conformation, termed the 'pre-catalytic' state, the ribozyme shows two Sr^{2+} binding sites. G43 and G42 interact with one Sr^{2+} whereas the second Sr^{2+} interacts with the A45, C23 and G24. This second Sr^{2+} binding site also potentially interacts with the 2'-OH of the C23 via a water molecule. This second binding site explains how Pb^{2+} could facilitate catalysis by abstracting the 2-OH proton and prepare it for an in-line nucleophillic attack on the scissile phosphate. This is also supported by the fact the reaction of the leadzyme is pH dependent. Thus, Pb^{2+} could be acting as a Lewis acid and activating the 2-OH of C23. The crystal structure is consistent with a two-metal ion mechanism that has been proposed for leadzyme catalysis.

== Lead toxicity through leadzyme ==
Toxic metals like lead are environmental and health hazards and can enter biological systems upon exposure. Lead is a persistent metal and can accumulate in human body over time due to its frequent usage in industries and presence in our environment. Inhalation of lead can have effects that can be range from subtle symptoms to serious illnesses. It is possible that presence of lead in our biological systems can induce catalysis by lead ions. Since leadzyme is a relatively simple motif i.e., it has a simple fold, it appears that there are many sequences in the genomes of many natural systems which can potentially fold into a leadzyme structure. A simple search for this RNA motif in the genomes of humans, Drosophila melanogaster, Caenorhabditis elegans and Arabidopsis thaliana revealed that on average this motif is present with the frequency of 2-9 motifs for 1 Mbp of DNA sequence. They also showed that leadzyme motif is very common in the mRNA sequences of these organisms as well. Thus, these sequences could potentially self-cleave in the presence of lead ions. The targeting of these RNA motifs by lead in mRNAs and other RNAs may explain lead-mediated toxicity resulting in cell death.
