= OLE RNA =

Ornate Large Extremophilic RNA
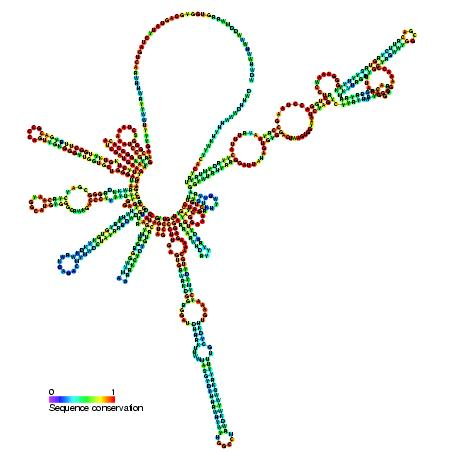
- Predicted secondary structure and sequence conservation of OLE

Identifiers
- Symbol: OLE
- Rfam: RF01071

Other data
- RNA type: Gene
- Domain: Bacteria
- SO: SO:0001263
- PDB structures: PDBe https://www.rcsb.org/structure/7KKV

OLE RNA (Ornate Large Extremophilic RNA) is a conserved RNA structure present in certain bacteria. The RNA averages roughly 610 nucleotides in length. The only known RNAs that are longer than OLE RNA are ribozymes such as the group II intron and ribosomal RNAs. The exceptional length and highly conserved structure of OLE RNA prompted the hypothesis that OLE RNA could be a ribozyme, or otherwise perform an intricate biochemical task.

OLE RNAs are predominantly found in the order Clostridiales, but other kinds of Bacillota contain OLE RNAs as well. Organisms containing OLE RNA are predominantly extremophiles and anaerobes.

OLE RNAs are transcribed as RNA, and experiments in Bacillus halodurans show that it is transcribed in a mRNA with 10 other genes. The adjacent genes are conserved in the vicinity of OLE RNA in most species containing it, but in Desulfitobacterium hafniense they are located elsewhere on the chromosome. OLE RNAs are processed from the larger transcript into a shorter RNA that roughly corresponds to the conserved, ~610-nucleotide structure. Genes encoding a protein class of unknown function are typically located immediately downstream of OLE RNAs, and the presence of this protein class is correlated in species with the presence of OLE RNA. This correlation suggests a possible functional association between the RNA and the protein.

X-ray structural studies revealed key elements that help specifically recognise the OapB protein in Bacillus halodurans.
