= Exitron =

Part of a gene

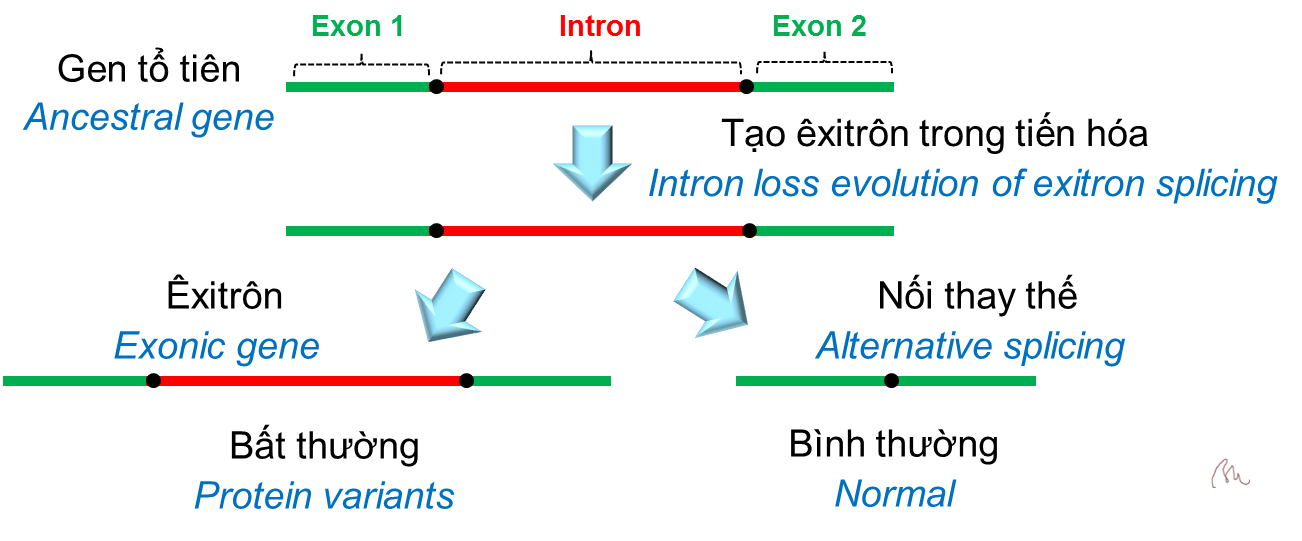
Scheme to make an exitron, which produces a variant protein

Exitrons (exonic introns) are produced through alternative splicing and have characteristics of both introns and exons, but are described as retained introns. Even though they are considered introns, which are typically cut out of pre mRNA sequences, there are significant problems that arise when exitrons are spliced out of these strands, with the most obvious result being altered protein structures and functions. They were first discovered in plants, but have recently been found in metazoan species as well.

== Alternative splicing ==
Exitrons are a result of alternative splicing (AS), in which introns are typically cut out of a pre mRNA sequence, while exons remain in the sequence and are translated into proteins. The same sequence within a pre mRNA strand can be considered an intron or exon depending on the desired protein to be produced. As a result, different final mRNA sequences are generated and a large variety of proteins can be made from one single gene. Mutations that exist in these sequences can also alter the way in which a sequence is spliced and as a result, change the protein produced. Splicing mutations of a mRNA sequence has been found to account for 15-60% of human genetic diseases, which suggests there may be a crucial role of exitrons in organ homeostasis.

== Discovery ==
A previous study had looked at alternative splicing in Rockcress (Arabidopsis) plants and pinpointed characteristics of retained introns in sequences. They had a subset of what they called "cryptic introns" that did not contain stop codons and are now deemed exitrons. The same researchers conducted further studies on their newly discovered exitrons and found 1002 exitrons in 892 Rockcress genes, a flowering plant that has been used to model exitrons. Although they were discovered in plants, exitrons have also been found in other metazoan species and humans as well. A recent comprehensive analysis of exitron splicing in 33 cancer types highlighted the abundance and impact of exitrons in human cancers. This study revealed exitron splicing disrupts functional protein domains, causing cancer driver effects and introducing a new potential source of neoantigens.

== Distinguishing these regions from typical introns ==
Transcripts with exitrons in their sequences can be distinguished from those with retained introns in several ways: (1) transcripts containing exitrons are transported out of the nucleus to be translated, whereas those containing introns are identified as incompletely processed and are kept in the nucleus where they cannot be translated. (2) only transcripts with exitrons of lengths not divisible by three have the potential to incorporate premature termination sequences, while sequences with introns normally result in premature termination. Thus, frameshifting exitron events were more likely to evade nonsense-mediated decay (NMD) than intron retentions. (3) exitron transcripts are usually the major isoforms, but those with introns are only present in small amounts. (4) exitrons had distinct cis-acting features such as weak 5′ and 3′ splice sites, high GC content, and short length compared to retained introns.

== Characteristics ==
Exitrons are considered introns, but have characteristics of both introns and exons. They originated from ancestral coding exons, but have weaker splice site signals than other introns. Exitrons have been found to be longer and have a higher GC content than intron regions and constitutive introns. However, they are of similar size to constitutive exons and their GC content is lower compared to other exons. Exitrons lack stop codons within their sequences, have synonymous substitutions, and are most commonly found in multiples of three nucleotides. Exitron sequences contain sites for numerous post-translational modifications, including sumoylation, ubiquitylation, S-nitrosylation, and lysine acetylation. The ability of exitron splicing (EIS) to alter protein states demonstrates the effect it can have on proteome assortment.

=== In Arabidopsis ===
Exitron splicing affects 3.3% of Arabidopsis protein coding genes. 11% of intron regions were composed of exitrons and 3.7% of AS events detected in a sample were exitron splicings. The regulation of EIS in tissues is controlled by certain stresses, which serves as a regulatory role in plant adaptation and development.

=== In human cancers ===
An analysis showed that exitron splicing affected 63% of human coding genes and that 95% of those events were tumor-specific. It was found that exitron splicing occurred more frequently in cancer tissues (63%), compared to normal human tissue cells (17%), with the highest rate of exitron splicing occurring in ovarian, esophageal, stomach, and acute myeloid leukemia tumors. Using a generalized additive model, researchers determined that exitron splicing dysregulation in cancers could largely be explained by differential expression of splicing factors.

== Effects ==
Exitron splicing has been found to be a conserved strategy for increasing proteome plasticity in both plants and animals since it affects plant and human protein features in a similar manner. When exitrons are spliced out of a sequence, it has resulted in internally deleted proteins and affected protein domains, disordered regions, and various post-translational modification sites that impact protein function. Spliced exitrons can result in premature termination of a protein, while in contrast, a non-spliced exitron results in a full-length protein.

The processing of these exitrons has been found to be sensitive to cell types and environmental conditions and their splicing is linked to cancer. The impairment of EIS can potentially contribute to the initiation of cancer formation through its effect on several cancer-related genes. These genes include oncogenes and genes involved in cell adhesion, migration, and metastasis.

EIS also facilitated the discovery of novel cancer driver genes. One of the significantly exitron-spliced genes (SEGs), NEFH, which rarely experiences mutations, was identified as a novel tumor suppressor in prostate cancer. Exitron splicing has the potential to introduce highly immunogenic neoantigens, which can be targetable with immunotherapy, thereby providing a promising avenue for cancer treatment.

== See also ==
- Exon – Region of a transcribed gene present in the final functional mRNA molecule
- Intron – Part of a gene that is spliced away
- Outron – A gene sequence removed from RNA transcripts by trans-splicing
- Twintron – Intron-within-intron excised by splicing reactions
