= Group I catalytic intron =

Large self-splicing ribozymes

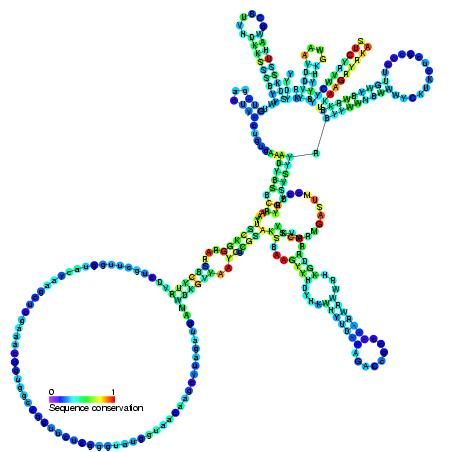
- Predicted secondary structure and sequence conservation of Group I catalytic intron

Identifiers
- Symbol: Intron_gpI
- Rfam: RF00028

Other data
- RNA type: Intron
- Domain(s): Eukaryota; Bacteria; Viruses
- GO: GO:0000372
- SO: SO:0000587
- PDB structures: PDBe

Group I introns are large self-splicing ribozymes. They catalyze their own excision from mRNA, tRNA and rRNA precursors in a wide range of organisms. The core secondary structure consists of nine paired regions (P1-P9). These fold to essentially two domains – the P4-P6 domain (the "scaffolding" domain, which is formed from the stacking of P5, P4, P6 and P6a helices) and the P3-P9 domain (the "catalytic" domain, which is formed from the P8, P3, P7 and P9 helices). The secondary structure mark-up for this family represents only this conserved core. Certain subclasses of Group I introns also contain peripheral structural domains that provide additional structural support to the intron. Group I introns often have long open reading frames inserted in loop regions.

== Catalysis ==
Splicing of group I introns is processed by two sequential transesterification reactions. First an exogenous guanosine or guanosine nucleotide (exoG) docks onto the active G-binding site located in P7, and then its 3'-OH is aligned to attack the phosphodiester bond at the "upstream" (closer to the 5' end) splice site located in P1, resulting in a free 3'-OH group at the upstream exon and the exoG being attached to the 5' end of the intron. Then the terminal G (omega G) of the intron swaps out the exoG and occupies the G-binding site, preparing the second ester-transfer reaction: the 3'-OH group of the upstream exon in P1 is aligned to attack the downstream splice site in P10, leading to the ligation of the adjacent upstream and downstream exons and release of the catalytic intron.

The two-metal-ion mechanism seen in protein polymerases and phosphatases was proposed to be used by group I and group II introns to process the phosphoryl transfer reactions, which was unambiguously proved by a high-resolution structure of the Azoarcus group I intron in 2006.

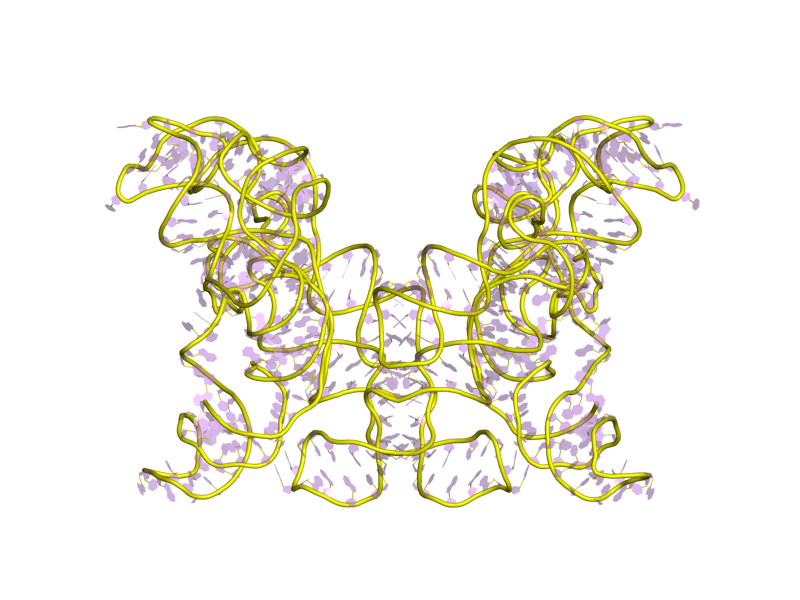
A 3D representation of the Group I catalytic intron. This view shows the active site in the crystal structure of the Tetrahymena ribozyme.

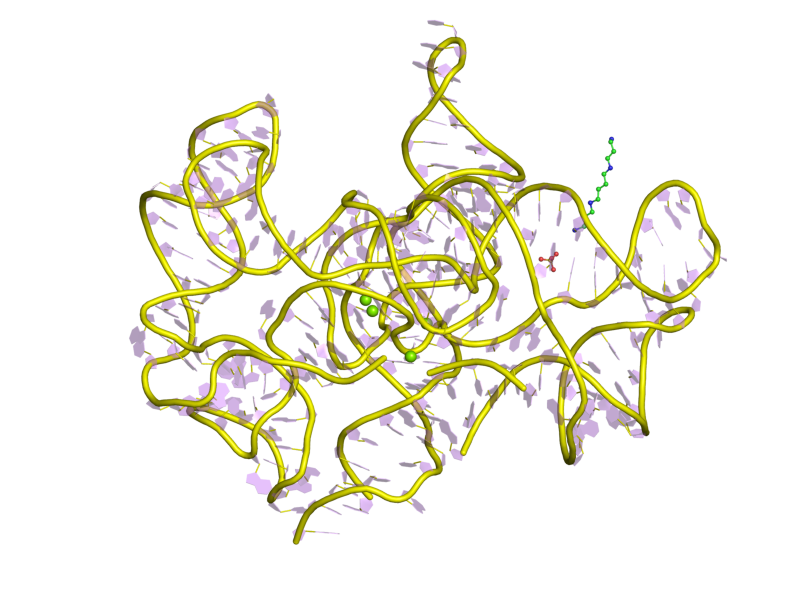
A 3D representation of the Group I catalytic intron. This is the crystal structure of a phage Twort group I ribozyme-product complex.

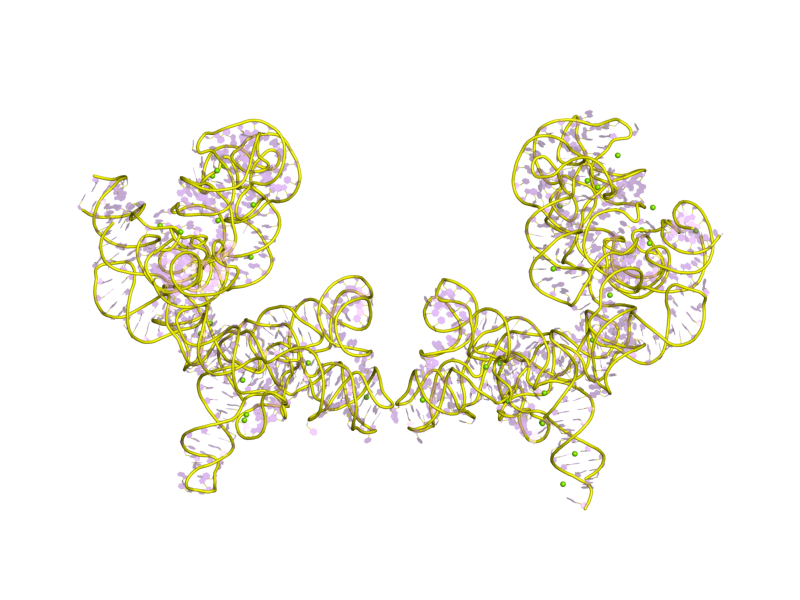
A 3D representation of the Group I catalytic intron. This is the structure of the Tetrahymena ribozyme with a base triple sandwich and metal ion at the active site.

== Intron folding ==
Since the early 1990s, scientists started to study how the group I intron achieves its native structure in vitro, and some mechanisms of RNA folding have been appreciated thus far. It is agreed that the tertiary structure is folded after the formation of the secondary structure. During folding, RNA molecules are rapidly populated into different folding intermediates, the intermediates containing native interactions are further folded into the native structure through a fast folding pathway, while those containing non-native interactions are trapped in metastable or stable non-native conformations, and the process of conversion to the native structure occurs very slowly. It is evident that group I introns differing in the set of peripheral elements display different potentials in entering the fast folding pathway. Meanwhile, cooperative assembly of the tertiary structure is important for the folding of the native structure. Nevertheless, folding of group I introns in vitro encounters both thermodynamic and kinetic challenges. A few RNA binding proteins and chaperones have been shown to promote the folding of group I introns in vitro and in bacteria by stabilizing the native intermediates, and by destabilizing the non-native structures, respectively.

== Distribution, phylogeny and mobility ==
Group I introns are distributed in bacteria, lower eukaryotes and higher plants. However, their occurrence in bacteria seems to be more sporadic than in lower eukaryotes, and they have become prevalent in higher plants. The genes that group I introns interrupt differ significantly: They interrupt rRNA, mRNA and tRNA genes in bacterial genomes, as well as in mitochondrial and chloroplast genomes of lower eukaryotes, but only invade rRNA genes in the nuclear genome of lower eukaryotes. In higher plants, these introns seem to be restricted to a few tRNA and mRNA genes of the chloroplasts and mitochondria.

Group I introns are also found inserted into genes of a wide variety of bacteriophages of Gram-positive bacteria. However, their distribution in the phage of Gram-negative bacteria is mainly limited to the T4, T-even and T7-like bacteriophages.

Both intron-early and intron-late theories have found evidences in explaining the origin of group I introns. Some group I introns encode homing endonuclease (HEG), which catalyzes intron mobility. It is proposed that HEGs move the intron from one location to another, from one organism to another and thus account for the wide spreading of the selfish group I introns. No biological role has been identified for group I introns thus far except for splicing of themselves from the precursor to prevent the death of the host that they live by. A small number of group I introns are also found to encode a class of proteins called maturases that facilitate the intron splicing.

== See also ==
- Intron
- Group I Intron Sequence and Structure Database
- Splice site
- Nuclear introns
- Group II intron
- Group III intron
- Twintron
- LtrA
- Cyclic di-GMP-II riboswitch, where there is an example of a riboswitch acting together with a group I intron to regulate the expression of a gene
