= Ligase ribozyme =

Type of synthetic ribozyme

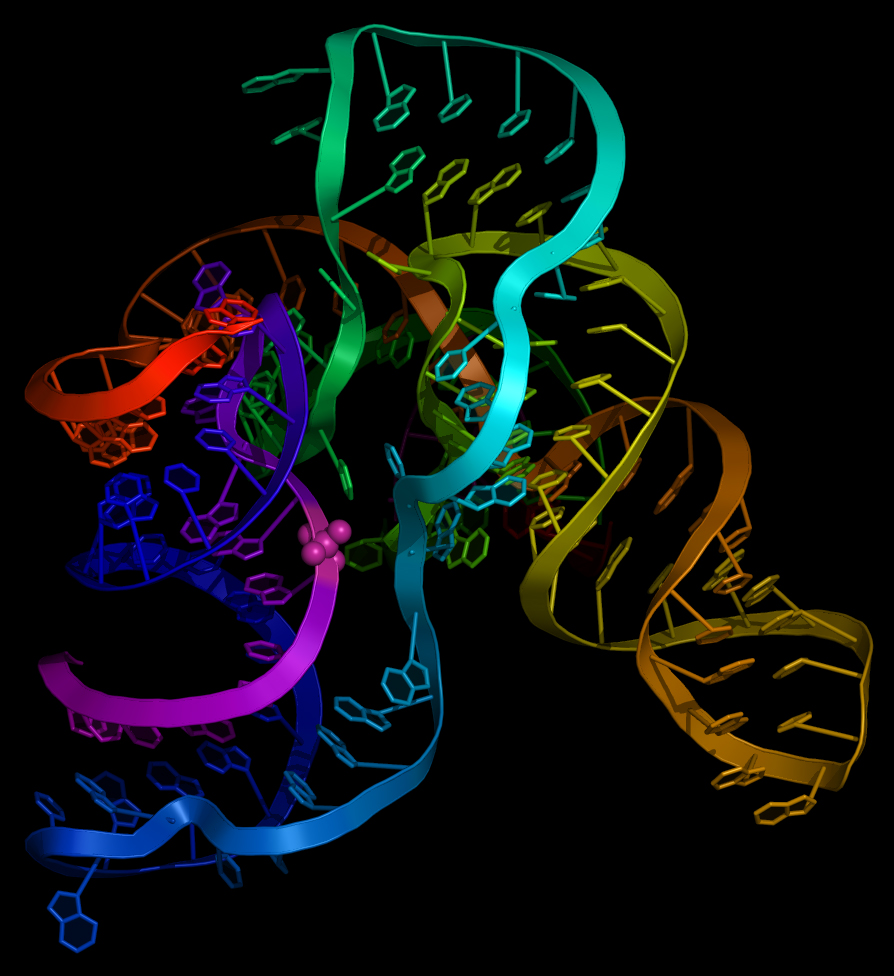
Crystal structure of the Class I ligase ribozyme at 2.98 Å resolution (PDB ID: 3HHN). The phosphodiester bond formed by this enzyme is shown as spheres.

The L1 Ligase Ribozyme 2.6 Å crystal structure

The RNA Ligase ribozyme was the first of several types of synthetic ribozymes produced by in vitro evolution and selection techniques. They are an important class of ribozymes because they catalyze the assembly of RNA fragments into phosphodiester RNA polymers, a reaction required of all extant nucleic acid polymerases and thought to be required for any self-replicating molecule. Ideas that the origin of life may have involved the first self-replicating molecules being ribozymes are called RNA World hypotheses. Ligase ribozymes may have been part of such a pre-biotic RNA world.

In order to copy RNA, fragments or monomers (individual building blocks) that have 5′-triphosphates must be ligated together. This is true for modern (protein-based) polymerases, and is also the most likely mechanism by which a ribozyme self-replicase in an RNA world might function. However, no one has found a natural ribozyme that can perform this reaction.

== In vitro evolution and selection ==
RNA in vitro evolution or SELEX enables the artificial evolution and selection of RNA molecules that possess a desired property, such as binding affinity for a particular ligand or an activity such as that of an enzyme or catalyst. The first such selections involved isolation of various aptamers that bind to small molecules. The first catalytic RNAs produced by in vitro evolution were RNA ligases, catalytic RNAs that join two RNA fragments to produce a single adduct. The most active ligase known to date is the Class I ligase, isolated from random sequence (work of David Bartel, while in the Szostak lab). Other examples of RNA ligases include the L1 ligase (Robertson and Ellington), the R3C ligase (Joyce), the DSL ligase (Inoue). All these ligases catalyze the formation of a 3′–5′ phosphodiester bond between two RNA fragments.

== The L1 ligase ==
Michael Robertson and Andrew Ellington evolved a ligase ribozyme that performs the desired 5′–3′ RNA assembly reaction, and called this the L1 ligase. To better understand the details of how this ribozyme folds into a structure that permits it to catalyze this fundamental reaction, the X-ray crystal structure has been solved. The structure is composed of three helical stems called stem A, B and C, that connect at a three helix junction.
