= Database for bacterial group II introns =

Database for bacterial group II introns.

Content
- Description: bacterial group II introns.

Contact
- Research center: University of Calgary
- Laboratory: Department of Biological Sciences
- Authors: Manuel A Candales
- Primary citation: Candales & al. (2012)
- Release date: 2011

Access
- Website: http://webapps2.ucalgary.ca/~groupii/index.html#

The Database for Bacterial Group II Introns is a repository of full-length, non-redundant group II introns present in bacterial DNA sequence. The database is first established in 2002 with roughly 40 introns. In less than 10 years, the database has expanded to 400 introns. Current database includes a wealth of information on the properties, structures, and classification of group II intron. In addition, it contains a list of intron insertion sites, DNA sequences, protein-encoding sequences, as well as RNA secondary structures.

== See also ==
- group II intron
