= Twintron =

Intron-within-intron excised by splicing reactions

In molecular biology, a twintron is an intron-within-intron excised by sequential splicing reactions. A twintron is presumably formed by the insertion of a mobile intron into an existing intron.

== Discovery ==
Twintrons were discovered by Donald W. Copertino and Richard B. Hallick as a group II intron within another group II intron in Euglena chloroplast genome. They found that splicing of both the internal and external introns occurs via lariat intermediates. Additionally, twintron splicing was found to proceed by a sequential pathway, the internal intron being removed prior to the excision of the external intron.

Since the original discovery, there have been other reports of Group III twintrons and GroupII/III twintrons in the chloroplast of Euglena gracilis. In 1993 a new type of complex twintron composed of four individual group III introns has been characterized. The external intron was interrupted by an internal intron containing two additional introns. In 1995 scientists discovered the first non-Euglena twintron in cryptomonad alga Pyrenomonas salina. In 2004, several twintrons were discovered in Drosophila.

== Distribution ==
The majority of these twintrons have been characterized within the Euglena chloroplast genome but these elements have also been found in cryptomonad algae (Pyrenomonas salina), and group I intron based twintrons (group I inserted within a group I intron) have been described in Didymium iridis. Since the discovery of the psbF twintron, several categories of twintrons have been characterized. A twintron can be simple (external intron interrupted by 1 internal intron), or complex (external intron interrupted by multiple internal introns). Most probably, the internal and external introns comprising the twintron element are from the same category; group I internal to group I, group II internal to group II, and group III internal to group III. Mixed twintrons (consisting of introns belonging to different categories) were characterized from the Euglena gracilis rps3 gene in which an internal group II intron is found to interrupt an external group III intron. In Rhodomonas salina (=Pyrenomonas salina) twintrons (nested group II/group III introns) were identified where the internal intron lost its splicing capacity, essentially merging with the outer intron forming one splicing unit. Recently, two novel twintrons have been uncovered within the fungal mitochondrial genome, one at position mS917 of the Cryphonectria parasitica mt-rns gene, where a group ID intron encoding a LAGLIDADG ORF invaded another ORF-less group ID intron. Another twintron complex was detected at position mS1247 of the Chaetomium thermophilumhere mt-rns gene, a group IIA1 intron invaded the open reading frame embedded within a group IC2 intron. The mS1247 twintron represents the first recorded fungal mitochondrial mixed twintron consisting of group II intron as an internal intron and a group I intron as an external intron. In mS1247 twintron, splicing of the internal group IIA1 intron reconstitutes the open reading frame encoded within the group IC2 intron and thus facilitates the expression of the encoded homing endonuclease. The mS1247 twintron encod ORF have been biochemically characterized and the results showed that it is an active homing endonuclease that could potentially mobilize the twintron to rns genes that have not yet been invaded by this mobile composite element.

== See also ==
- Exitron – Part of a gene
- Exon – Region of a transcribed gene present in the final functional mRNA molecule
- Intron – Part of a gene that is spliced away
- Outron – A gene sequence removed from RNA transcripts by trans-splicing
