= Lariat (disambiguation) =

A lariat is a rope in the form of a lasso.

Lariat may also refer to:

- A rope necklace long enough to loop several times around the neck
- Lariat chain, a science demonstration
- A genetic structure in RNA splicing
- A professional wrestling attack, a move
- A trim package for the Ford F-Series
- The trade name for Alachlor, a herbicide
- The Lariat, a 1927 short novel by Jaime de Angulo
- LArIAT, a particle physics facility in Chicago
- LARIAT, a testbed for network security applications
