= Beta-globin co-transcriptional cleavage ribozyme =

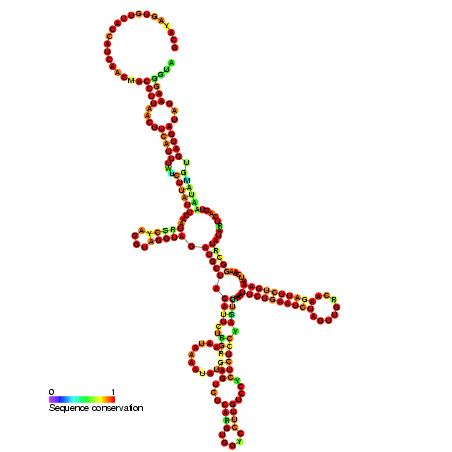
- Predicted secondary structure and sequence conservation of CoTC_ribozyme

Identifiers
- Symbol: CoTC_ribozyme
- Rfam: RF00621

Other data
- RNA type: Gene; ribozyme
- Domain: Eukaryota
- SO: SO:0000374
- PDB structures: PDBe

The Beta-globin co-transcriptional cleavage ribozyme (CotC ribozyme) was a proposed ribozyme (short for ribonucleic acid enzyme).

Transcription termination of RNA polymerase II transcripts is proposed to occur by a two-stage process. The first stage involves pre-termination cleavage (PTC) of the nascent transcript downstream of the poly(A) site. This process is also referred to as co-transcriptional cleavage (CoTC). The CoTC process in the human beta-globin gene was proposed to involve an RNA self-cleaving activity located in the 3' flanking region of the beta-globin gene. The CoTC core is highly conserved in the 3' UTR of other primate beta-globin genes.

However, there has been no independent confirmation of these findings, and a subsequent analysis by a team including members of the original report failed to demonstrate ribozyme activity.
