= GISSD =

Content
- Description: Group I Intron Sequence and Structure Database.

Contact
- Primary citation: PMID 17942415

Access
- Website: http://www.rna.whu.edu.cn/gissd/

The Group I Intron Sequence and Structure Database (GISSD) is a database of Group I catalytic intron.

== See also ==
- Group I catalytic intron
