= Small t intron =

The small T intron is an intron, that is used in some plasmid vectors, in order to induce gene expression in mammalian cells.

Plasmid vectors are circular strands of DNA, found in virions, that are used in genetic engineering to integrate new genes into a host cell genome.

== Function ==
The function of this intron in the vectors is unknown, but it is hypothesized that it might be involved in splicing or translation efficiency.

Vectors such as pME18s contain it.
