= GFPT1 =

Protein-coding gene in the species Homo sapiens

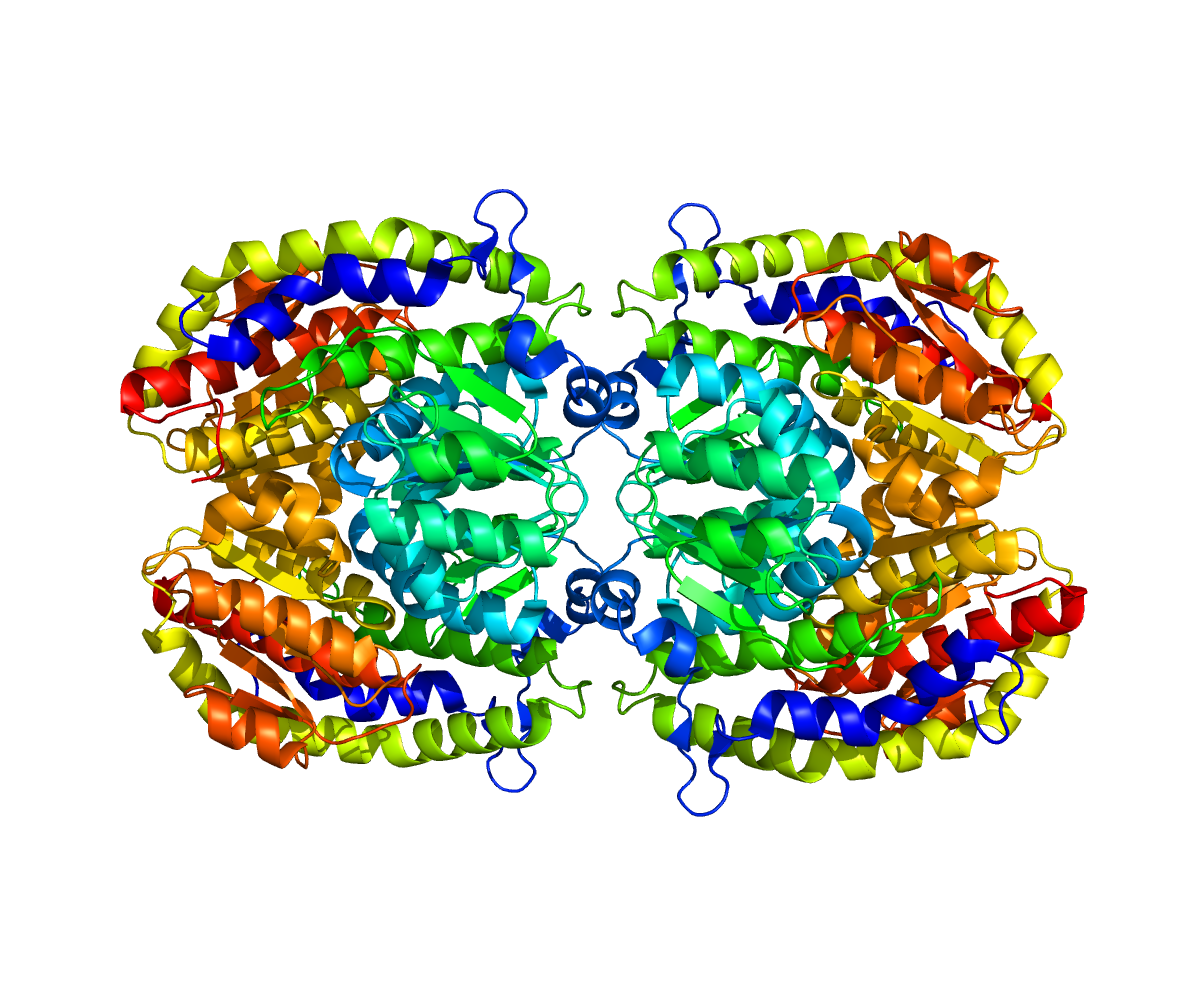

Identifiers
- Aliases: GFPT1, CMSTA1, GFA, GFAT, GFAT 1, GFAT1, GFAT1m, GFPT, GFPT1L, MSLG, CMS12, glutamine--fructose-6-phosphate transaminase 1
- External IDs: OMIM: 138292; MGI: 95698; GeneCards: GFPT1
Available structures
PDB	Ortholog search: PDBe RCSB
PDB	List of PDB id codes 2V4M, 2ZJ3, 2ZJ4
Enzyme activity
EC #	BRENDA	ExPASy	KEGG	MetaCyc
2.6.1.16	↗	↗	↗	↗

Gene location (Human)
Chr.	Chromosome 2 (human)
Band	2p13.3	Start	69,319,780 bp
Band	2p13.3	End	69,387,250 bp

Gene location (Mouse)
Chr.	Chromosome 6 (mouse)
Band	6 D1|6 37.81 cM	Start	87,019,828 bp
Band	6 D1|6 37.81 cM	End	87,069,179 bp
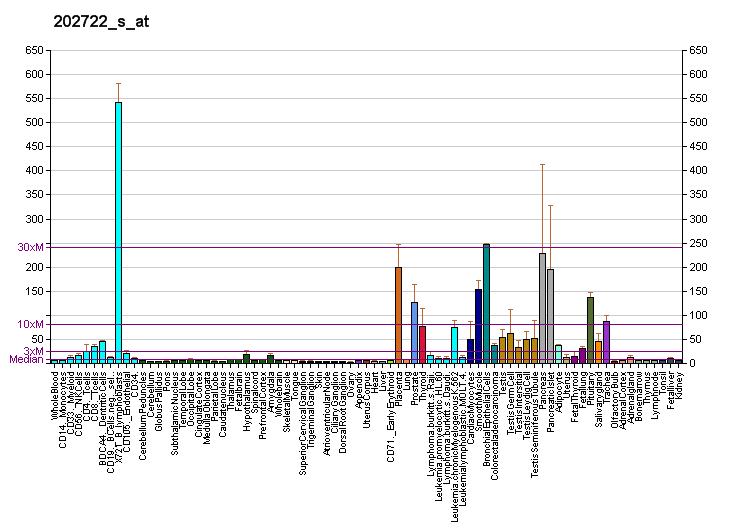

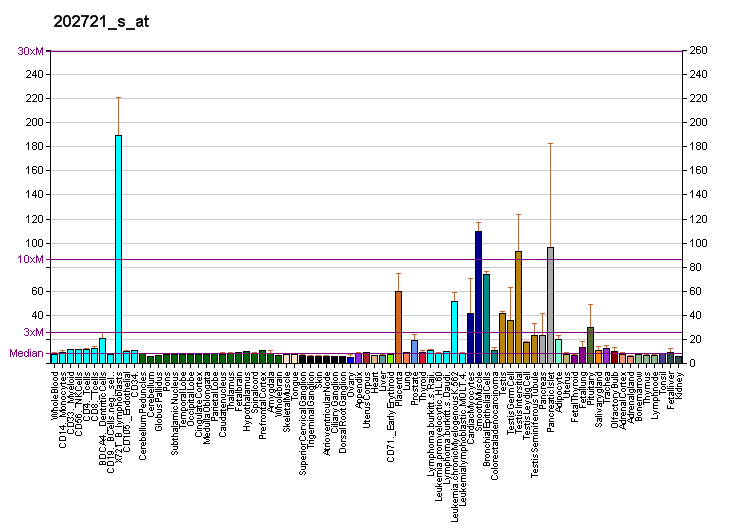
RNA expression pattern
Bgee	Human / Mouse (ortholog); Top expressed in: mucosa of sigmoid colon; secondary oocyte; islet of Langerhans; rectum; stromal cell of endometrium; corpus epididymis; jejunal mucosa; Achilles tendon; cartilage tissue; mucosa of ileum / Top expressed in: left colon; parotid gland; submandibular gland; conjunctival fornix; Paneth cell; epithelium of stomach; condyle; Epithelium of choroid plexus; fossa; seminal vesicula; More reference expression data
BioGPS	More reference expression data
Gene ontology
Molecular function	transferase activity; transaminase activity; carbohydrate derivative binding; glutamine-fructose-6-phosphate transaminase (isomerizing) activity
Cellular component	cytosol; extracellular exosome
Biological process	rhythmic process; circadian regulation of gene expression; IRE1-mediated unfolded protein response; glutamine metabolic process; UDP-N-acetylglucosamine biosynthetic process; energy reserve metabolic process; carbohydrate derivative biosynthetic process; fructose 6-phosphate metabolic process; carbohydrate derivative metabolic process; UDP-N-acetylglucosamine metabolic process; protein N-linked glycosylation
Sources:Amigo / QuickGO
Orthologs
Databases	NCBI: entry; OMA: entry
Species	Human	Mouse
Entrez	2673	14583
Ensembl	ENSG00000198380	ENSMUSG00000029992
UniProt	Q06210	P47856
RefSeq (mRNA)	NM_002056; NM_001244710	NM_013528
RefSeq (protein)	NP_001231639; NP_002047	NP_038556
Location (UCSC)	Chr 2: 69.32 – 69.39 Mb	Chr 6: 87.02 – 87.07 Mb
PubMed search
- Wikidata
View/Edit Human	View/Edit Mouse

Glucosamine—fructose-6-phosphate aminotransferase isomerizing 1 is an enzyme that in humans is encoded by the GFPT1 gene.

Glutamine-fructose-6-phosphate transaminase 1 is the first and rate-limiting enzyme of the hexosamine pathway. GFAT controls the flux of glucose into the hexosamine pathway and catalyzes the formation of glucosamine 6-phosphate.
