= Group III intron =

Genetic intron in some protists

Group III intron is a class of introns found in mRNA genes of chloroplasts in euglenid protists. They have a conventional group II-type dVI with a bulged adenosine, a streamlined dI, no dII-dV, and a relaxed splice site consensus. Splicing is done with two transesterification reactions with a dVI bulged adenosine as initiating nucleophile; the intron is excised as a lariat. Not much is known about how they work, although an isolated chloroplast transformation system has been constructed.

== Discovery and identification ==
In 1984, Montandon and Stutz reported examples of a novel type of introns in Euglena chloroplast. In 1989, David A. Christopher and Richard B. Hallick found a few more examples and proposed the name "Group III introns" to identify this new class with the following characteristics:

- Group III introns are much shorter than other self-splicing intron classes, ranging from 95 to 110 nucleotides amongst those known to Christopher and Hallick, and identified in chloroplasts. On the other hand, Christopher and Hallick stated: "By contrast, the smallest Euglena chloroplast group II intron ... is 277 nucleotides."
- Their conserved sequences proximal to the splicing sites have similarities to those of group II introns, but have fewer conserved positions.
- They do not map into the conserved secondary structure of group II introns. (Indeed, Christopher and Hallick were unable to identify any conserved secondary structure elements among group III introns.)
- They are usually associated with genes involved in translation and transcription.
- They are very A+T rich.

In 1994, discovery of a group III intron with a length of one order of magnitude longer indicated that length alone is not the determinant of splicing in Group III introns.

Splicing of group III introns occurs through lariat and circular RNA formation. Similarities between group III and nuclear introns include conserved 5' boundary sequences, lariat formation, lack of internal structure, and ability to use alternate splice boundaries.

== See also ==
- Twintron
