= Ribozyme =

Type of RNA molecules

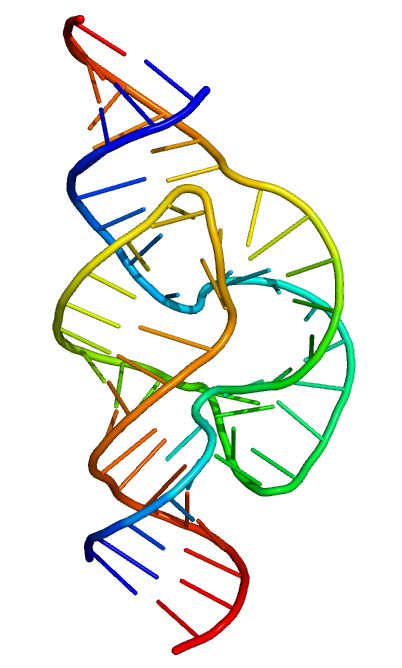
3D structure of a hammerhead ribozyme

Ribozymes (ribonucleic acid enzymes) are RNA molecules that have the ability to catalyze specific biochemical reactions, including RNA splicing in gene expression, similar to the action of protein enzymes. The 1982 discovery of ribozymes demonstrated that RNA can be both genetic material (like DNA) and a biological catalyst (like proteins), and contributed to the RNA world hypothesis, which suggests that RNA may have been important in the evolution of prebiotic self-replicating systems.

The most common activities of natural or in vitro evolved ribozymes are the cleavage or ligation of RNA and DNA, and peptide bond formation. For example, the smallest ribozyme known (GUGGC-3') can aminoacylate a GCCU-3' sequence in the presence of Phenylalanyl-Adenosine Monophosphate. Within the ribosome, ribozymes function as part of the large subunit ribosomal RNA to link amino acids during protein synthesis. They also participate in a variety of RNA processing reactions, including RNA splicing, viral replication, and transfer RNA biosynthesis. Examples of ribozymes include the hammerhead ribozyme, the VS ribozyme, leadzyme, and the hairpin ribozyme.

Researchers who are investigating the origins of life through the RNA world hypothesis have been working on discovering a ribozyme with the capacity to self-replicate, which would require it to have the ability to catalytically synthesize polymers of RNA. This should be able to happen in prebiotically plausible conditions with high rates of copying accuracy to prevent degradation of information, but also allowing for the occurrence of occasional errors during the copying process to allow for Darwinian evolution to proceed.

Attempts have been made to develop ribozymes as therapeutic agents, as enzymes which target defined RNA sequences for cleavage, as biosensors, and for applications in functional genomics and gene discovery.

== Discovery ==
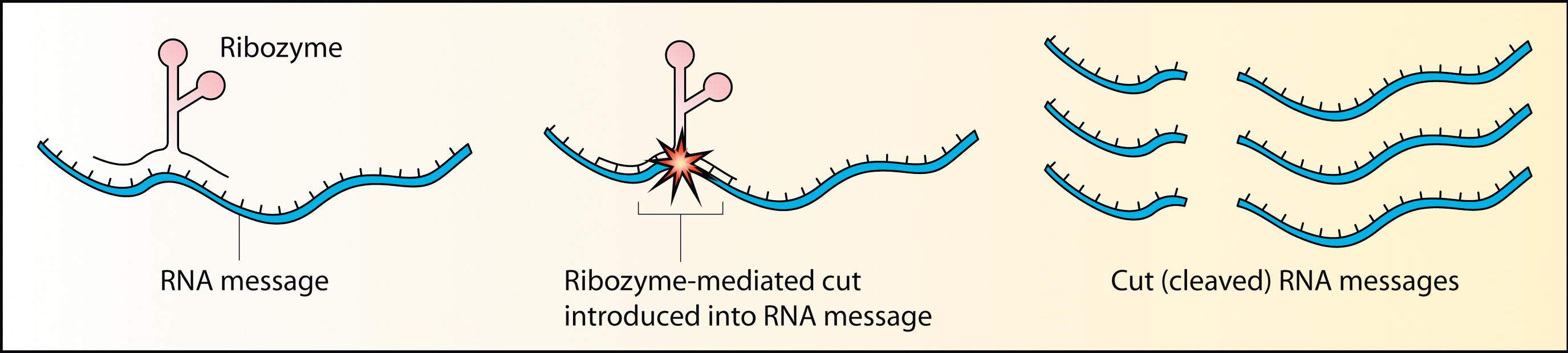
Schematic showing ribozyme cleavage of RNA

Before the discovery of ribozymes, enzymes—which were defined [solely] as catalytic proteins—were the only known biological catalysts. In 1967, Carl Woese, Francis Crick, and Leslie Orgel were the first to suggest that RNA could act as a catalyst. This idea was based upon the discovery that RNA can form complex secondary structures. These ribozymes were found in the intron of an RNA transcript, which removed itself from the transcript, as well as in the RNA component of the RNase P complex, which is involved in the maturation of pre-tRNAs. In 1989, Thomas R. Cech and Sidney Altman shared the Nobel Prize in chemistry for their "discovery of catalytic properties of RNA". The term ribozyme was first introduced by Kelly Kruger et al. in a paper published in Cell in 1982.

It had been a firmly established belief in biology that catalysis was reserved for proteins. However, the idea of RNA catalysis is motivated in part by the old question regarding the origin of life: Which comes first, enzymes that do the work of the cell or nucleic acids that carry the information required to produce the enzymes? The concept of "ribonucleic acids as catalysts" circumvents this problem. RNA, in essence, can be both the chicken and the egg.

In the 1980s, Thomas Cech, at the University of Colorado Boulder, was studying the excision of introns in a ribosomal RNA gene in Tetrahymena thermophila. While trying to purify the enzyme responsible for the splicing reaction, he found that the intron could be spliced out in the absence of any added cell extract. As much as they tried, Cech and his colleagues could not identify any protein associated with the splicing reaction. After much work, Cech proposed that the intron sequence portion of the RNA could break and reform phosphodiester bonds. At about the same time, Sidney Altman, a professor at Yale University, was studying the way tRNA molecules are processed in the cell when he and his colleagues isolated an enzyme called RNase-P, which is responsible for conversion of a precursor tRNA into the active tRNA. Much to their surprise, they found that RNase-P contained RNA in addition to protein and that RNA was an essential component of the active enzyme. This was such a foreign idea that they had difficulty publishing their findings. The following year, Altman demonstrated that RNA can act as a catalyst by showing that the RNase-P RNA subunit could catalyze the cleavage of precursor tRNA into active tRNA in the absence of any protein component.

Since Cech's and Altman's discovery, other investigators have discovered other examples of self-cleaving RNA or catalytic RNA molecules. Many ribozymes have either a hairpin – or hammerhead – shaped active center and a unique secondary structure that allows them to cleave other RNA molecules at specific sequences. It is now possible to make ribozymes that will specifically cleave any RNA molecule. These RNA catalysts may have pharmaceutical applications. For example, a ribozyme has been designed to cleave the RNA of HIV. If such a ribozyme were made by a cell, all incoming virus particles would have their RNA genome cleaved by the ribozyme, which would prevent infection.

== Structure and mechanism ==
Despite having only four choices for each monomer unit (nucleotides), compared to 20 amino acid side chains found in proteins, ribozymes have diverse structures and mechanisms. In many cases they are able to mimic the mechanism used by their protein counterparts. For example, in self cleaving ribozyme RNAs, an in-line SN2 reaction is carried out using the 2' hydroxyl group as a nucleophile attacking the bridging phosphate and causing 5' oxygen of the N+1 base to act as a leaving group. In comparison, RNase A, a protein that catalyzes the same reaction, uses a coordinating histidine and lysine to act as a base to attack the phosphate backbone.

Like many protein enzymes, metal binding is also critical to the function of many ribozymes. Often these interactions use both the phosphate backbone and the base of the nucleotide, causing drastic conformational changes. There are two mechanism classes for the cleavage of a phosphodiester backbone in the presence of metal. In the first mechanism, the internal 2'- OH group attacks the phosphorus center in a SN_{2} mechanism. Metal ions promote this reaction by first coordinating the phosphate oxygen and later stabling the oxyanion. The second mechanism also follows a SN_{2} displacement, but the nucleophile comes from water or exogenous hydroxyl groups rather than RNA itself. The smallest ribozyme is UUU, which can promote the cleavage between G and A of the GAAA tetranucleotide via the first mechanism in the presence of Mn^{2+}. The reason why this trinucleotide (rather than the complementary tetramer) catalyzes this reaction may be because the UUU-AAA pairing is the weakest and most flexible trinucleotide among the 64 conformations, which provides the binding site for Mn^{2+}.

Phosphoryl transfer can also be catalyzed without metal ions. For example, pancreatic ribonuclease A and hepatitis delta virus (HDV) ribozymes can catalyze the cleavage of RNA backbone through acid-base catalysis without metal ions. Hairpin ribozyme can also catalyze the self-cleavage of RNA without metal ions, but the mechanism for this is still unclear.

Ribozyme can also catalyze the formation of peptide bond between adjacent amino acids by lowering the activation entropy.

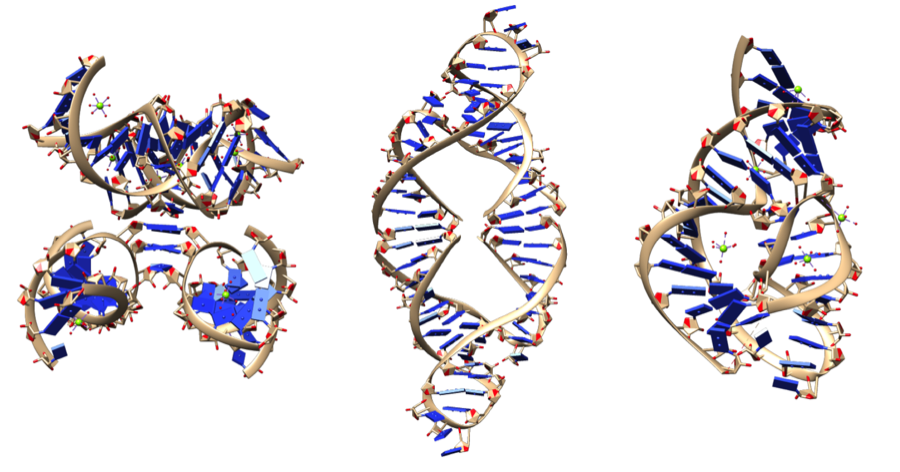
Image showing the diversity of ribozyme structures. From left to right: leadzyme, hammerhead ribozyme, twister ribozyme

== Activities ==
A ribosome is a biological machine that utilizes a ribozyme to translate RNA into proteins.

Although ribozymes are quite rare in most cells, their roles are sometimes essential to life. For example, the functional part of the ribosome, the biological machine that translates RNA into proteins, is fundamentally a ribozyme, composed of RNA tertiary structural motifs that are often coordinated to metal ions such as Mg^{2+} as cofactors. In a model system, there is no requirement for divalent cations in a five-nucleotide RNA catalyzing trans-phenylalanation of a four-nucleotide substrate with 3 base pairs complementary with the catalyst, where the catalyst/substrate were devised by truncation of the C3 ribozyme.

The best-studied ribozymes are probably those that cut themselves or other RNAs, as in the original discovery by Cech and Altman. However, ribozymes can be designed to catalyze a range of reactions or they have them naturally. Some of these activities include the following:

- RNA endonuclease
- nucleotidyl transferase
- phosphotransferase
- phosphatase
- ligase
- kinase
- glucano transferase

RNA may catalyze folding of the pathological protein conformation of a prion in a manner similar to that of a chaperonin.

== Ribozymes and the origin of life ==
RNA can also act as a hereditary molecule, which encouraged Walter Gilbert to propose that in the distant past, the cell used RNA as both the genetic material and the structural and catalytic molecule rather than dividing these functions between DNA and protein as they are today; this hypothesis is known as the "RNA world hypothesis" of the origin of life. Since nucleotides and RNA (and thus ribozymes) can arise by inorganic chemicals, they are candidates for the first enzymes, and in fact, the first "replicators" (i.e., information-containing macro-molecules that replicate themselves). An example of a self-replicating ribozyme that ligates two substrates to generate an exact copy of itself was described in 2002. The discovery of the catalytic activity of RNA solved the "chicken and egg" paradox of the origin of life, solving the problem of origin of peptide and nucleic acid central dogma. According to this scenario, at the origin of life, all enzymatic activity and genetic information encoding was done by one molecule: RNA.

Ribozymes have been produced in the laboratory that are capable of catalyzing the synthesis of other RNA molecules from activated monomers under very specific conditions, these molecules being known as RNA polymerase ribozymes. The first RNA polymerase ribozyme was reported in 1996, and was capable of synthesizing RNA polymers up to 6 nucleotides in length. Mutagenesis and selection has been performed on an RNA ligase ribozyme from a large pool of random RNA sequences, resulting in isolation of the improved "Round-18" polymerase ribozyme in 2001 which could catalyze RNA polymers now up to 14 nucleotides in length. Upon application of further selection on the Round-18 ribozyme, the B6.61 ribozyme was generated and was able to add up to 20 nucleotides to a primer template in 24 hours, until it decomposes by cleavage of its phosphodiester bonds.

The rate at which ribozymes can polymerize an RNA sequence multiples substantially when it takes place within a micelle.

The next ribozyme discovered was the "tC19Z" ribozyme, which can add up to 95 nucleotides with a fidelity of 0.0083 mutations/nucleotide. Next, the "tC9Y" ribozyme was discovered by researchers and was further able to synthesize RNA strands up to 206 nucleotides long in the eutectic phase conditions at below-zero temperature, conditions previously shown to promote ribozyme polymerase activity.

The RNA polymerase ribozyme (RPR) called tC9-4M was able to polymerize RNA chains longer than itself (i.e. longer than 177 nt) in magnesium ion concentrations close to physiological levels, whereas earlier RPRs required prebiotically implausible concentrations of up to 200 mM. The only factor required for it to achieve this was the presence of a very simple amino acid polymer called lysine decapeptide.

The most complex RPR synthesized by that point was called 24-3, which was newly capable of polymerizing the sequences of a substantial variety of nucleotide sequences and navigating through complex secondary structures of RNA substrates inaccessible to previous ribozymes. In fact, this experiment was the first to use a ribozyme to synthesize a tRNA molecule. Starting with the 24-3 ribozyme, Tjhung et al. applied another fourteen rounds of selection to obtain an RNA polymerase ribozyme by in vitro evolution termed '38-6' that has an unprecedented level of activity in copying complex RNA molecules. However, this ribozyme is unable to copy itself and its RNA products have a high mutation rate. In a subsequent study, the researchers began with the 38-6 ribozyme and applied another 14 rounds of selection to generate the '52-2' ribozyme, which compared to 38-6, was again many times more active and could begin generating detectable and functional levels of the class I ligase, although it was still limited in its fidelity and functionality in comparison to copying of the same template by proteins such as the T7 RNA polymerase.

An RPR called t5(+1) adds triplet nucleotides at a time instead of just one nucleotide at a time. This heterodimeric RPR can navigate secondary structures inaccessible to 24-3, including hairpins. In the initial pool of RNA variants derived only from a previously synthesized RPR known as the Z RPR, two sequences separately emerged and evolved to be mutualistically dependent on each other. The Type 1 RNA evolved to be catalytically inactive, but complexing with the Type 5 RNA boosted its polymerization ability and enabled intermolecular interactions with the RNA template substrate obviating the need to tether the template directly to the RNA sequence of the RPR, which was a limitation of earlier studies. Not only did t5(+1) not need tethering to the template, but a primer was not needed either as t5(+1) had the ability to polymerize a template in both 3' → 5' and 5' 3 → 3' directions.

A highly evolved RNA polymerase ribozyme was able to function as a reverse transcriptase, that is, it can synthesize a DNA copy using an RNA template. Such an activity is considered to have been crucial for the transition from RNA to DNA genomes during the early history of life on earth. Reverse transcription capability could have arisen as a secondary function of an early RNA-dependent RNA polymerase ribozyme.

An RNA sequence that folds into a ribozyme is capable of invading duplexed RNA, rearranging into an open holopolymerase complex, and then searching for a specific RNA promoter sequence, and upon recognition rearrange again into a processive form that polymerizes a complementary strand of the sequence. This ribozyme is capable of extending duplexed RNA by up to 107 nucleotides, and does so without needing to tether the sequence being polymerized.

A short 20-nucleotide RNA variant ribozyme was identified that self-reproduces via template directed ligation of two 10 nucleotide oligomers. This minimal kind of RNA self-reproduction was discovered in a random pool of oligmers, and may represent an early step in the emergence of an RNA based genetic system from primordial components.

== Ribozyme based origin of sexual reproduction ==
Sexual reproduction might have been present in the RNA world that preceded DNA cellular life forms. Early cellular life forms having genomes with single copies of essential RNA ribozyme molecules would likely have been vulnerable to environmental damaging conditions that could block replication of an essential ribozyme thus causing cell death. Merger of two such damaged early cells (sexual interaction) would allow undamaged combinations of RNA segments to come together, thus facilitating formation of a functional genome and allowing survival of the cell and ability to reproduce.

== Artificial ribozymes ==
Since the discovery of ribozymes that exist in living organisms, there has been interest in the study of new synthetic ribozymes made in the laboratory. For example, artificially produced self-cleaving RNAs with good enzymatic activity have been produced. Tang and Breaker isolated self-cleaving RNAs by in vitro selection of RNAs originating from random-sequence RNAs. Some of the synthetic ribozymes that were produced had novel structures, while some were similar to the naturally occurring hammerhead ribozyme.

In 2015, researchers at Northwestern University and the University of Illinois Chicago engineered a tethered ribosome that works nearly as well as the authentic cellular component that produces all the proteins and enzymes within the cell. Called Ribosome-T, or Ribo-T, the artificial ribosome was created by Michael Jewett and Alexander Mankin. The techniques used to create artificial ribozymes involve directed evolution. This approach takes advantage of RNA's dual nature as both a catalyst and an informational polymer, making it easy for an investigator to produce vast populations of RNA catalysts using polymerase enzymes. The ribozymes are mutated by reverse transcribing them with reverse transcriptase into various cDNA and amplified with error-prone PCR. The selection parameters in these experiments often differ. One approach for selecting a ligase ribozyme involves using biotin tags, which are covalently linked to the substrate. If a molecule possesses the desired ligase activity, a streptavidin matrix can be used to recover the active molecules.

Lincoln and Joyce used in vitro evolution to develop ribozyme ligases capable of self-replication in about an hour, via the joining of pre-synthesized highly complementary oligonucleotides.

Although not true catalysts, the creation of artificial self-cleaving riboswitches, termed aptazymes, has also been an active area of research. Riboswitches are regulatory RNA motifs that change their structure in response to a small molecule ligand to regulate translation. While there are many known natural riboswitches that bind a wide array of metabolites and other small organic molecules, only one ribozyme based on a riboswitch has been described: glmS. Early work in characterizing self-cleaving riboswitches was focused on using theophylline as the ligand. In these studies, an RNA hairpin is formed which blocks the ribosome binding site, thus inhibiting translation. In the presence of the ligand, in these cases theophylline, the regulatory RNA region is cleaved off, allowing the ribosome to bind and translate the target gene. Much of this RNA engineering work was based on rational design and previously determined RNA structures rather than directed evolution as in the above examples. More recent work has broadened the ligands used in ribozyme riboswitches to include thymine pyrophosphate. Fluorescence-activated cell sorting has also been used to engineering aptazymes.

== Applications ==
Ribozymes have been proposed and developed for the treatment of disease through gene therapy. One major challenge of using RNA-based enzymes as a therapeutic is the short half-life of the catalytic RNA molecules in the body. To combat this, the 2' position on the ribose is modified to improve RNA stability. One area of ribozyme gene therapy has been the inhibition of RNA-based viruses.

A type of synthetic ribozyme directed against HIV RNA called gene shears has been developed and has entered clinical testing for HIV infection.

Similarly, ribozymes have been designed to target the hepatitis C virus RNA, SARS coronavirus (SARS-CoV), Adenovirus and influenza A and B virus RNA. The ribozyme is able to cleave the conserved regions of the virus's genome, which has been shown to reduce the virus in mammalian cell culture. Despite these efforts by researchers, these projects have remained in the preclinical stage.

== Known ribozymes ==
Well-validated naturally occurring ribozyme classes:

- rRNA – Found in all living cells and links amino acids to form proteins.
- GIR1 branching ribozyme – Lariat capping ribozyme
- RNase P – cleaves off a precursor sequence of RNA on tRNA molecules
- VS ribozyme – cleavage of a phosphodiester bond (sugar and phosphate)
- Group I self-splicing intron
- Group II self-splicing intron – Spliceosome is likely derived from Group II self-splicing ribozymes.
- Hairpin ribozyme – catalyzes self-cleavage and joining (ligation) reactions
- Hammerhead ribozyme – catalyzes reversible cleavage and ligation reactions
- HDV ribozyme – acts to process the RNA transcripts to unit lengths in a self-cleavage reaction
- glmS ribozyme – regulates the glmS gene by self-cleaving upon activation by GlcN6P
- Twister ribozyme – self-cleaving
- Twister sister ribozyme – self-cleaving
- Pistol ribozyme – self-cleaving
- Hatchet ribozyme – self-cleaving
- Viroids infectious circular RNAs that have no protein coating.

== See also ==
- Deoxyribozyme
- Spiegelman Monster
- Catalysis
- Enzyme
- RNA world hypothesis
- Peptide nucleic acid
- Nucleic acid analogues
- PAH world hypothesis
- SELEX
- OLE RNA
- Beta-globin co-transcriptional cleavage ribozyme
