= Outron =

Gene sequence removed from RNA transcripts by trans-splicing

An outron is a nucleotide sequence at the 5' end of the primary transcript of a gene that is removed by a special form of RNA splicing during maturation of the final RNA product. Whereas intron sequences are located inside the gene, outron sequences lie outside the gene.

== Characteristics ==
The outron is an intron-like sequence possessing similar characteristics such as the G+C content and a splice acceptor site that is the signal for trans-splicing. Such a trans-splice site is essentially defined as an acceptor (3') splice site without an upstream donor (5') splice site.

In eukaryotes such as euglenozoans, dinoflagellates, sponges, nematodes, cnidarians, ctenophores, flatworms, crustaceans, chaetognaths, rotifers, and tunicates, the length of spliced leader (SL) outrons range from 30 to 102 nucleotides (nt), with the SL exon length ranging from 16 to 51 nt, and the full SL RNA length ranging from 46 to 141 nt.

== Processing ==
In standard cis-splicing, the donor splice site in upstream position is required together with an acceptor site located on downstream position on the same pre-RNA molecule. By contrast, the SL trans-splicing relies on a 3' acceptor splice site on the outron, and a 5' donor splice site (GU dinucleotide) located on a separate RNA molecule, the SL RNA. Moreover, the outron of the premature mRNA contains a branchpoint adenosine — followed by a downstream polypyrimidine tract — which interacts with the intron-like portion of the SL RNA to form a 'Y' branched byproduct, reminiscent of the lasso structure formed during intron splicing. Nuclear machinery then resolves this 'Y' branching structure by trans-splicing the SL RNA sequence to the 3′ trans-splice acceptor site (AG dinucleotide) of the pre-mRNA.

When outrons are processed, the SL exon is trans-spliced to distinct, unpaired, downstream acceptor sites adjacent to each open reading frame of the polycistronic pre-mRNA, leading to distinct mature capped transcripts.

== See also ==
- Exon – Region of a transcribed gene present in the final functional mRNA molecule
- Messenger RNA – RNA that is read by the ribosome to produce a protein
