= LtrA =

LtrA is an open reading frame found in the Lactococcus lactis group II introns LtrB. It is an intron-encoded protein, which consists of three subdomains: a reverse-transcriptase/maturase, DNA endonuclease, and DNA/RNA binding domain. LtrA helps to capture and stabilize the catalytically active conformation of the LtrB group II intron RNA. It also functions in group II intron retrohoming.
