= Hatchet ribozyme =

Self-cleaving ribozyme

Hatchet
- Consensus secondary structure and sequence conservation of Hatchet ribozyme

Identifiers
- Symbol: Hatchet
- Rfam: RF02678

Other data
- RNA type: Gene; Ribozyme
- GO: GO:0003824
- SO: SO:0000374
- PDB structures: PDBe

The Hatchet ribozyme is an RNA structure that catalyzes its own cleavage at a specific site. In other words, it is a self-cleaving ribozyme. Hatchet ribozymes were discovered by a bioinformatics strategy as RNAs Associated with Genes Associated with Twister and Hammerhead ribozymes, or RAGATH.

Subsequent biochemical analysis supports the conclusion of a ribozyme function, and determined further characteristics of the chemical reaction catalyzed by the ribozyme.

Nucleolytic ribozymes are small RNAs that adopt compact folds capable of site-specific cleavage/ligation reactions. 14 unique nucleolytic ribozymes have been identified to date, including recently discovered twister, pistol, twister-sister, and Hatchet ribozymes that were identified based on application of comparative sequence and structural algorithms.

The consensus sequence and secondary structure of this class includes 13 highly conserved and numerous other modestly conserved nucleotides inter-dispersed among bulges linking four base-paired substructures. A representative Hatchet ribozyme requires divalent cations such as Mg^{2+} to promote RNA strand scission with a maximum rate constant of ~4/min. As with all other small self-cleaving ribozymes discovered to date, Hatchet ribozymes employ a general mechanism for catalysis consisting of a nucleophilic attack of a ribose 2′-oxygen atom on the adjacent phosphorus center. Kinetic characteristics of the reaction demonstrate that members of this ribozyme class have an essential requirement for divalent metal cations and that they have a complex active site which employs multiple catalytic strategies to accelerate RNA cleavage by internal phosphoester transfer.

== Mechanism ==
Nucleolytic ribozymes like the Hatchet ribozyme adopt an SN2-like mechanism that results in site-specific phosphodiester bond cleavage. An activated 2′-OH of the ribose 5′ to the scissile phosphate adopts an in-line alignment to target the adjacent to-be-cleaved P-O5′ phosphodiester bond, resulting in formation of 2′,3′-cyclic phosphate and 5′-OH groups. X-ray crystallographic structural studies on the hammerhead, hairpin, GlmS, hepatitis delta virus (HDV), Varkud satellite, and pistol ribozymes have defined the overall RNA fold, the catalytic pocket arrangement, the in-line alignment, and the key residues that contribute to the cleavage reaction. The cleavage site is located at the 5' end of its consensus secondary motif.

In addition, the removal of the nucleophilic hydroxyl renders the ribozyme inactive as it is not able to create the cleavage site. More specifically, if the 2'-ribose or 2'-OH is replaced with a 2'-deoxyribose or 2'-H, there are no electrons available to perform the nucleophilic attack on the adjacent phosphate group. This results in no phosphoester bond being formed, which again inactivates the ribozyme's enzymatic cleavage ability.

== Secondary Structure ==
In 2019, researchers crystallized a 2.1 Å product of the Hatchet ribozyme. The consensus sequence is depicted in the image to the right. Most Hatchet ribozymes and ribozymes in general adopt a P0 configuration. P0 is an additional hairpin loop located at the 5' end of the cleavage site, though it does not contribute to catalytic activity or functionality unlike Hammerhead ribozymes which have a short consensus sequence near P1, or the 5' end, that promotes high speed catalytic activity. About 90% of the sequence is conserved and similar to other ribozymes in this class.

Based on the RNA sequence, the resulting DNA sequence which ends up coding for the Hatchet ribozyme is as follows from 5'-3' because in DNA uracil is replaced by thymine.

TTAGCAAGAATGACTATAGTCACTG TTTGTACACCCCGAATAGATTAGAA GCCTAATCATAATCACGTCTGCAAT TTTGGTACA

Due to this sequence construct, after self catalyzed cleavage, it leaves an 8 nucleotide residue upstream on the 3'-end of the RNA.

== Tertiary Structure ==
Each ribozyme may have different motifs and thus different tertiary structures:

The Tertiary structure of the Hatchet ribozyme with the motif of HT-UUCG is through dimerization. The dimer is formed through the swapping of the 3' ends of the pairing strands which is also in equilibrium with the dimer formed product of HT-GAAA. Therefore, the RNA sequence shifts between monomer and dimer configurations. To view the 3-D shape of the ribozyme see Figure S1A and B. Two molecules of the HT-GAAA ribozyme can actually form a pseudosymmetric dimer with both monomers of the ribozyme exhibiting relatively well-defined electron density. The tertiary fold consists of four stem substructures which covalently stack upon each other forming the helical and loop structures, called P1, P2, P3, and P4, L1, L2 and L3 respectively (though not shown in the figure above). The actual cleavage site is positioned between the junction of P1 and P2 adjacent to P3 and L2. P1 is composed of three or six base pairs roughly 40% and 60% of the time respectively in its natural state, suggesting that length corresponds to catalytic function.

There is also a conserved palindromic sequencing between base U70' and A67', which likely triggers the formation of the dimer due to Watson-Crick base pair interactions.

The tertiary structure also has long range implications within itself based on interactions between its loops.

== Effect of pH and Mg^{2+} ==
Ribozyme catalysis experiments were done by the addition of MgCl_{2} and stopped for measurement at each time point by the addition of a stop solution containing urea and EDTA.

A plot of the kobs values measured at pH 7.5 with increasing concentrations of Mg^{2+}. There is a sharp increase in ribozyme function that plateaus as the concentration approaches 10 mM. The steep slope observed at lower Mg^{2+} concentrations suggests that more than one metal ion is necessary for each RNA to achieve maximal ribozyme activity. Moreover, this suggests that the construct requires higher than normal physiological concentrations of Mg^{2+} to become completely saturated with Mg^{2+} as the cofactor. It is possible that native unimolecular constructs, also carrying P0, might achieve saturation at concentrations of Mg^{2+} that are closer to normal physiological levels.

The effect of pH on ribozyme rate constant in reactions containing 10 mM Mg^{2+} was also experimentally measured. pH-dependent ribozyme activity increases linearly with a slope of 1 until reaching a kobs, of a Michaelis-Menten plot, plateau of ~4/min near a pH value of 7.5. Any higher pH has the same catalytic effect and more acidic pH's begin denaturing the ribozyme and thus reducing catalytic function. Both the pH dependency and the maximum rate constant have interesting implications for the possible catalytic strategies used by this ribozyme class.

=== The effects of various mono- and divalent metal ions on Hatchet ribozyme activity ===
The Hatchet ribozyme construct remains completely inactive when incubated in the absence of Mg^{2+} in reactions containing only other monovalent cations at 1 M (Na^{+}, K^{+}, Rb^{+}, Li^{+}, Cs^{+}), 2.5 M (Na^{+}, K^{+}), or 3 M (Li^{+}). In contrast, other divalent metal ions such as Mn^{2+}, Co^{2+}, Zn^{2+}, and Cd^{2+} support ribozyme function with varying levels of efficiency. Furthermore, two metal ions (Zn^{2+}, Cd^{2+}) function only at low concentrations, and three metal ions (Ba^{2+}, Ni^{2+}, and Cu^{2+}) inhibit activity at 0.5 mM, even when Mg^{2+} is present. These results indicate that Hatchet ribozymes are relatively restrictive in their use of cations to promote catalysis, perhaps indicating that one or more specialized binding sites that accommodate a limited number of divalent cations are present in the RNA structure or perhaps even at the active site. Inhibition by certain divalent metal ions could be due to the displacement of critical Mg^{2+} ions or by general disruption of RNA folding.

== Significance/Applications ==
One standard application is to use flanking self-cleaving ribozymes to generate precisely cut out sequences of functional RNA molecules (i.e. shRNA, saiRNA, sgRNA). This is especially useful for in vivo expression of gene editing systems (i.e. CRISPR/Cas sgRNA) and inhibitory systems.

Another method is for in vivo transcription of siRNA. This design uses multiple self-cleaving ribozymes, which are all transcribed from the same gene. After cleavage, both parts of the precursor siRNA (siRNA 1 and 2) can form a double strand and act as intended. To see the setup, see saiRNA graphic

Lastly, if you want to combine self-cleaving ribozymes with protein sequences, it is important to know that the self-cleaving mechanism of the ribozymes will modify the mRNA. A 5' ribozyme will modify the downstream 5' end of the pre-mRNA, disabling the cell from creating a 5' cap. This decreases the stability of the pre-mRNA and prevents it from being fully functional mature mRNA. On the other side, a 3' ribozyme would prevent polyadenylation of the upstream pre-mRNA, again decreasing stability and preventing maturation. Both interfere with translation as well.
