= RNA hydrolysis =

Reaction that cleaves the RNA molecule

RNA hydrolysis is a reaction in which a phosphodiester bond in the sugar-phosphate backbone of RNA is broken, cleaving the RNA molecule. RNA is susceptible to this base-catalyzed hydrolysis because the ribose sugar in RNA has a hydroxyl group at the 2’ position. This feature makes RNA chemically unstable compared to DNA, which does not have this 2’ -OH group and thus is not susceptible to base-catalyzed hydrolysis.

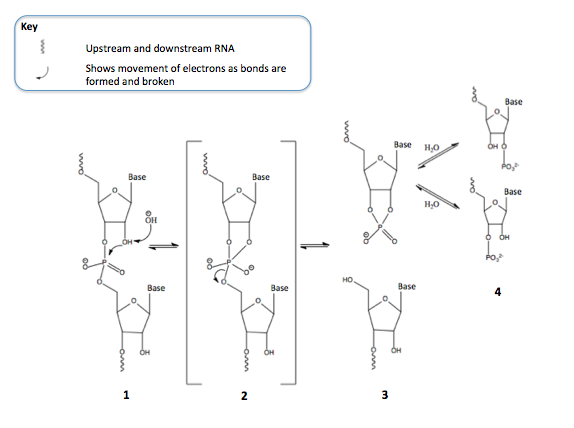
Mechanism of base catalyzed RNA hydrolysis. 1) Base-catalyzed deprotonation of the 2′-OH group, enabling the deprotonated 2′ hydroxyl's nucleophilic attack on the adjacent phosphorus. 2) Transition state. 3) Phosphodiester bond is broken, cleaving the RNA backbone. 4) The 2′,3′-cyclic phosphate group (in step 3) hydrolyzes to either the 2′ or 3′ phosphate.

== Mechanism ==
RNA hydrolysis occurs when the deprotonated 2’ OH of the ribose, acting as a nucleophile, attacks the adjacent phosphorus in the phosphodiester bond of the sugar-phosphate backbone of the RNA. There is a transition state (shown above), where the phosphorus is bonded to five oxygen atoms. The phosphorus then detaches from the oxygen connecting it to the adjacent sugar, resulting in ester cleavage of the RNA backbone. (This mechanism is also referred to as RNA cleavage.) This produces a 2’,3’-cyclic phosphate that can then yield either a 2’- or a 3’-nucleotide when hydrolyzed. This process is shown in Figure 1.

== Auto-hydrolysis ==
The hydrolysis or cleavage of RNA can occur spontaneously, without the presence of a catalyst or enzyme. This process is known as an auto-hydrolysis or a self-cleavage reaction. Spontaneous cleavage in an RNA molecule is much more likely to occur when it is single-stranded. Auto-hydrolysis or self-cleavage reactions take place in basic solutions, where free hydroxide ions in solution can easily deprotonate the 2’ OH of the ribose. This deprotonation makes the reaction base-catalyzed and increases spontaneity of the reaction.

== Enzyme cleavage ==
When the RNA is double-stranded or involved in nucleotide base pairing, it is more stable and spontaneous cleavage is significantly less likely. In these instances, cleavage is done using catalytic enzymes. Several different enzymes catalyze cleavage at specific sites on an RNA molecule.

One such enzyme is Ribonuclease A (RNase A), a protein enzyme. RNase A contains histidine in its active site, and uses it to accomplish acid-base catalysis and cleavage of RNA. Certain histidine residues in the active site act as bases to remove protons from 2’ hydroxyls of ribose sugars, while others act as acids to donate protons to the 5’ oxygen of adjacent riboses to make them better leaving groups. A lysine residue, also in the active site of RNase A, stabilizes the negatively charged oxygen atoms in the transition state.

A category of ribozymes called small ribonucleolytic ribozymes enhances the spontaneity of the cleavage of their own RNA using acid-base catalysis. Examples of such ribozymes include the hammerhead ribozyme, the Hepatitis Delta Virus (HDV) ribozyme, and the hairpin ribozyme. Large ribozymes, such as Group I introns, Group II introns, and RNase P, catalyze splicing and other post-trascriptional modifications during mRNA processing, using the cleavage mechanism described above.

== Possible applications ==
Researchers are developing and using various applications for RNA hydrolysis that can be carried out in a controlled way. Applications include the use of ribozymes in gene therapy to control gene expression in bacteria and eukaryotes, and to inhibit viral replication. Hammerhead ribozymes, in particular, can be designed such that they will cleave a desired RNA. These ribozymes can be designed to prevent expression of a particular gene, for example.

In addition to inhibiting gene expression, splicing ribozymes can be used to repair damaged or defective RNA. Splicing ribozymes catalyze RNA splicing, removing a section of RNA that contains a mutation and replacing it with well-functioning RNA. Existing ribozymes can also be altered in a way that changes the reaction(s) that the ribozyme catalyzes.
