= Arginine carboxypeptidase =

Arginine carboxypeptidase may refer to:

- Lysine carboxypeptidase, an enzyme
- Carboxypeptidase U, an enzyme
