= Twister sister ribozyme =

RNA structure

Twister-sister
- Consensus secondary structure and sequence conservation of Twister_sister_ribozyme

Identifiers
- Symbol: Twister-sister
- Rfam: RF02681

Other data
- RNA type: Gene; Ribozyme
- GO: GO:0003824
- SO: SO:0000374
- PDB structures: PDBe

The twister sister ribozyme (TS) is an RNA structure that catalyzes its own cleavage at a specific site. In other words, it is a self-cleaving ribozyme. The twister sister ribozyme was discovered by a bioinformatics strategy as an RNA Associated with Genes Associated with Twister and Hammerhead ribozymes, or RAGATH.

The twister sister ribozyme has a possible structural similarity to twister ribozymes. Some striking similarities were noted, but also surprising differences, such as the absence of the two pseudoknot interactions in the twister ribozyme. The exact nature of the structural relationship between twister and twister sister ribozymes, if any, has not been determined.

== Discovery ==
The twister sister ribozyme was discovered through a bioinformatic search. This study conducted a search for conserved RNA structures near known twister and hammerhead ribozymes as well as certain protein-coding genes based on the fact that many ribozymes are located near to each other and near those genetic fragments. Later they tested the self-cleaving activity of 15 conserved RNA motifs that were found in these regions. 3 out of the 15 RNA motifs showed self-cleaving activity, which were the twister sister ribozyme, the pistol ribozyme and the hatchet ribozyme.

== Structure ==
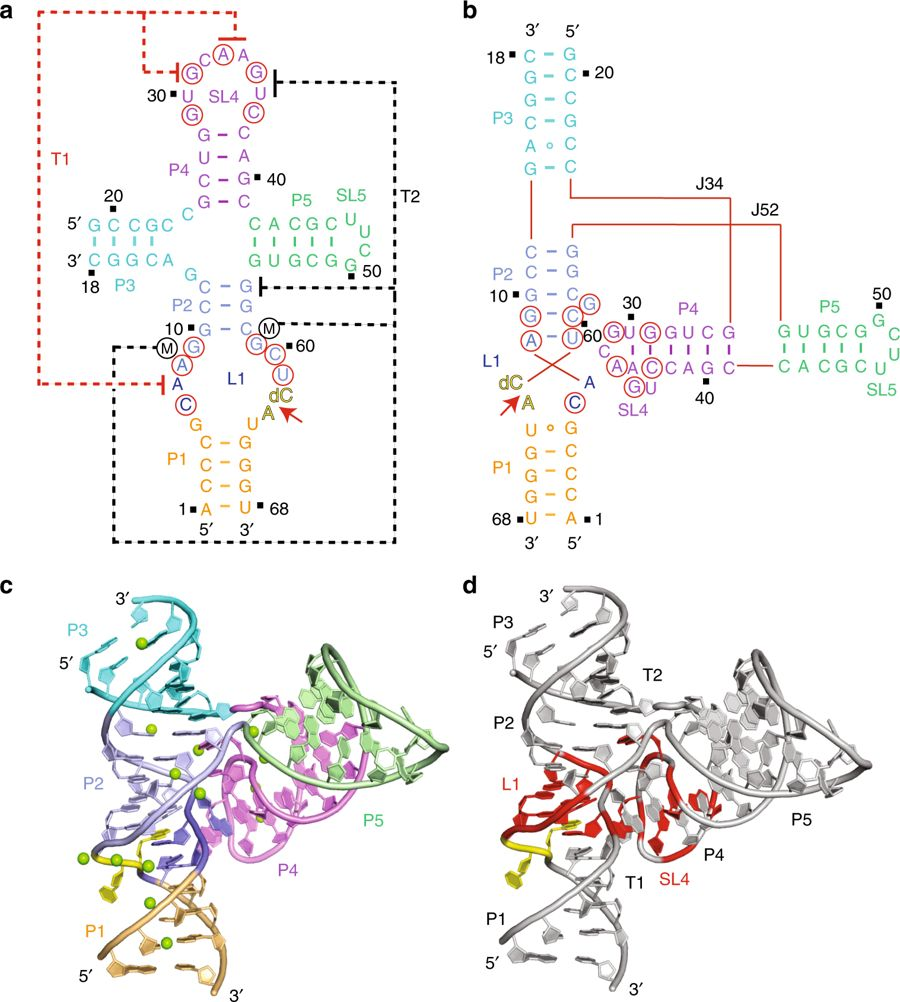
Schematic and tertiary structure of the twister-sister ribozyme. a Schematic of the secondary fold of the dC62-containing four-way junctional twister-sister ribozyme. b Schematic of the tertiary fold based on the crystal structure of the dC62-containing four-way junctional twister-sister ribozyme. c A ribbon view of the 2 Å structure of the four-way junctional twister-sister ribozyme color-coded as shown in a and b. The divalent metal ions identified in the tertiary structure are shown as green balls. d Highly conserved residues (shown in red) are brought into close proximity by the interaction between partially zippered-up L1 and SL4 loops in the tertiary fold of the twister-sister ribozyme

The crystal structures of the pre-catalytic state of the twister sister ribozymes were solved by two research groups independently.

The structure of a three-way junctional twister sister ribozyme is composed of two co-axial stacked helical sections connected with a three-way junction and two tertiary contacts. The active site, a scissile phosphate, is located in a loop with quasihelical character in one coaxial base-stacked helix. Five divalent metal ions are coordinate to RNA ligands, one of which is directly bound to C54 O2’ near the scissile phosphate and exchange inner sphere water molecules with the RNA ligands.

The crystal structure of a four-way junctional twister sister ribozyme is different from the three-way junctional one in terms of long-range interaction and active site structure. The active site of a four-way junctional twister sister is splayed-apart with an interaction between guanine and scissile phosphate. Besides, there are seven divalent metal ions in this ribozyme.

So far, we only know the pre-catalytic conformation of twister sister ribozymes. Understanding the transition state is needed to explain the relationship between twister ribozyme and twister sister ribozyme as well as the structure differences of the active site between the three-way and four-way junctional twister sister ribozymes.

== Catalytic mechanism ==
Generally, nucleolytic ribozymes cleave a specific phosphodiester linkage by SN2 mechanism. The O2' acts as a nucleophile to attack the adjacent P, with O5’ as a leaving group. The catalytic products are a cyclic 2’,3’ phosphate and a 5’-hydroxyl.

The catalytic activity of twister sister increases with pH and depends on divalent metal ion. The cleavage speed increases 10 fold with each increase in pH unit and reach a plateau near pH 7, which indicates that the 2-hydroxyl group of cytidine near the active site is fully deprotonated at pH 7 in the ribozyme. However, the structural basis for the catalytic activity is still under investigation.

The three-way junctional twister sister is a metalloenzyme. The inner sphere water of a divalent metal ion bound to C54 O2’ acts as a general base to deprotonate the 2-hydroxyl group, making it a stronger nucleophile, but the general acid which can stabilize the oxyanion leaving group remains unknown. This mechanism is supported by the exponential correlation between catalytic activity and the pKa of hydrated metal ion.

For the four-way junctional twister sister, Ren and coworkers find that guanine with an amino group is likely to play a role in the catalysis because G5 mutations result in very low catalytic activity. However, it remains unclear whether guanine directly participates in the catalysis as it is not absolutely conserved. The formation of a pseudoknot for four-way junctional TS was found to be highly Mg^{2+} dependent by conducting SHAPE (Selective-2′ -Hydroxyl Acylation analyzed by Primer Extension) experiments.
