= Thrombin-activatable fibrinolysis inhibitor =

Term thrombin-activatable fibrinolysis inhibitor may refer to:

- Carboxypeptidase B2, an enzyme that in humans is encoded by the CPB2 gene
- Lysine carboxypeptidase, an enzyme class
