= Protaminase =

Protaminase may refer to one of two enzymes:

- Lysine carboxypeptidase
- Carboxypeptidase B
