= Peptidyl-L-lysine(-L-arginine) hydrolase =

Peptidyl-L-lysine(-L-arginine) hydrolase may refer to the following enzymes:

- Lysine carboxypeptidase
- Carboxypeptidase E
