= Twister ribozyme =

Ribozyme capable of self-cleavage

Twister-P5
- Consensus secondary structure and sequence conservation of Type-P5 twister ribozyme

Identifiers
- Symbol: Twister-P5
- Rfam: RF02684

Other data
- RNA type: Gene; Ribozyme
- GO: GO:0003824
- SO: SO:0000374
- PDB structures: PDBe

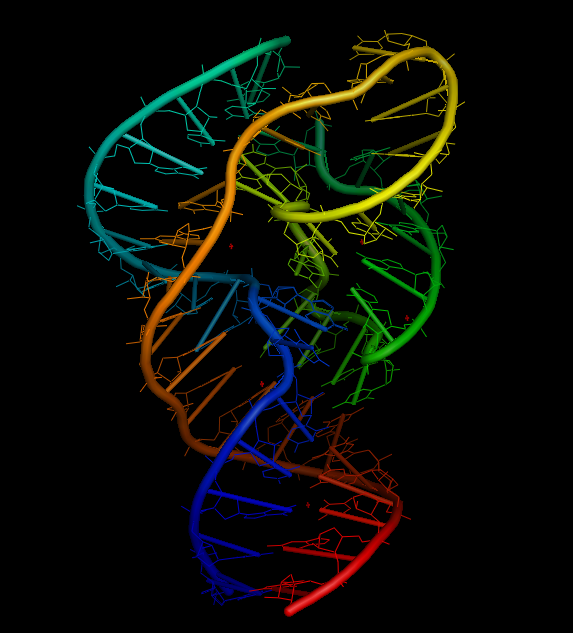

The twister ribozyme is a catalytic RNA structure capable of self-cleavage. The nucleolytic activity of this ribozyme has been demonstrated both in vivo and in vitro and has one of the fastest catalytic rates of naturally occurring ribozymes with similar function. The twister ribozyme is considered to be a member of the small self-cleaving ribozyme family which includes the hammerhead, hairpin, hepatitis delta virus (HDV), Varkud satellite (VS), and glmS ribozymes.

== Discovery ==
In contrast to in vitro selection methods, which have aided in identifying several classes of catalytic RNA motifs, the twister ribozyme was discovered by a bioinformatics approach as a conserved RNA structure of unknown function. The hypothesis that it functions as a self-cleaving ribozyme was suggested by the similarity between genes nearby to twister ribozymes and genes nearby to hammerhead ribozymes, Indeed, the genes located nearby to these two self-cleaving ribozyme classes overlap significantly. Researchers were inspired to name the newly found twister motif due to its resemblance to the Egyptian hieroglyph 'twisted flax'.

== Structure ==
The basic structure of the Oryza sativa twister ribozyme was crystallographically determined at atomic resolution in 2014. The active site of the twister ribozyme is centered in a double-pseudoknot, facilitating a compact fold structure through two long-range tertiary interactions, in partnership with a helical junction. Magnesium is important for secondary structure stabilization of the ribozyme.

== Catalytic Mechanism ==
Similar to other nucleolytic ribozymes, the twister ribozyme selectively cleaves phopshodiester bonds, through an S_{N}2-related mechanism, into a 2',3'-cyclic phosphate and 5' hydroxyl product. Both experimental and modelling evidence have supported a concerted general-acid-base catalysis involving highly conserved adenine (A1) and guanine (G33) bases, where N3 of A1 acts as a proton donor and G33 the general base. The twister ribozyme generates catalytic activity by specifically orienting the to-be-cleaved P O bond for in-line nucleophilic attack within the active site. Currently, it is known that the rate of reaction of the twister ribozyme is dependent on both pH and temperature. Replacements of the pro-S nonbridging oxygen of the scissile phosphate with a thiol group leads to reduced self-cleavage rates, suggesting that the mechanism is not reliant on bound magnesium. Rescue of the thiol-derivative by cadmium cations indicates that divalent metal ions play a role in rate enhancement. A likely mechanism for this is the stabilization of the transition state by reducing electrostatic strain on the substrate strand from the growing negative charge during cleavage.

== Prevalence in Nature ==
The twister ribozyme motif is relatively common in nature with 2,700 examples observed across bacteria, fungi, plants, and animals. Similarly to hammerhead ribozymes, some eukaryotes contain large numbers of twister ribozymes. In the most extreme known example, there are 1051 predicted twister ribozymes in Schistosoma mansoni, an organism that also contains many hammerhead ribozymes. In bacteria, twister ribozymes are near to gene classes that are also commonly associated with bacterial hammerhead ribozymes. Currently, there is no understood biological function associated with the twister ribozyme.
