= Transposon silencing =

Transposon silencing is a form of transcriptional gene silencing targeting transposons. Transcriptional gene silencing is a product of histone modifications that prevent the transcription of a particular area of DNA. Transcriptional silencing of transposons is crucial to the maintenance of a genome. The "jumping" of transposons generates genomic instability and can cause extremely deleterious mutations. Transposable element insertions have been linked to many diseases including hemophilia, severe combined immunodeficiency, and predisposition to cancer. The silencing of transposons is therefore extremely critical in the germline in order to stop transposon mutations from developing and being passed on to the next generation. Additionally, these epigenetic defenses against transposons can be heritable. Studies in Drosophila, Arabidopsis thaliana, and mice all indicate that small interfering RNAs are responsible for transposon silencing. In animals, these siRNAS and piRNAs are most active in the gonads.

== Mechanism ==
Piwi-interacting RNA (piRNA), the largest class of the small RNAs, are between 26 and 31 nucleotides in length and function through interactions with piwi proteins from the Argonaute protein family (gene silencing proteins). Many piRNAs are derived from transposons and other repeated elements, and therefore lack specific loci. Other piRNAs that do map to specific locations are clustered in areas near the centromeres or telomeres of the chromosome. piRNA clusters make up ~1% of the genome. It is thought that piRNA-PIWI complexes directly control the activity of transposons. piRNAs bound to PIWI proteins seem to use post-transcriptional transcript destruction to silence transposons. Transposon insertions in introns can escape silencing via the piRNA pathway, suggesting that transcript destruction by piRNAs occurs after nuclear export. piRNAs could, however, act on multiple levels, including guiding heterochromatin assembly and possibly playing a role in translation as well . The exact biogenesis of piRNAs is still unknown. Most piRNAs are antisense to mRNAs transcribed from the silenced transposons, generally associating with Piwi and Aubergine (Aub) proteins, while sense-strand piRNAs tend to associate with Argonaute 3 (Ago3) instead. A cycle called "ping pong" amplification proceeds between the sense and anti-sense piRNAs involving extensive trimming and processing to create mature piRNAs. This process is responsible for the production of most piRNAs in the germline and could also explain the origin of piRNAs in germline development.

== History ==
piRNAs were first observed in Drosophila in 1990. In 2003, piRNAs derived largely from repeated sequence elements, including transposons, were found in abundance in male and female Drosophila germlines. Since then, several studies have identified various piRNAs and piwi-pathways involved in transposon silencing in various species. Two such genome defense systems against transposons are the silencing of the MuDR transposon in maize and the silencing of P elements in Drosophila.

=== MuDR ===
In 2006, a study by Margaret Roth Woodhouse, Michael Freeling, and Damon Lisch identified a gene that inhibits the transcription of both transposons and paramuted color gens in maize. The gene, called Mediator of paramutation1 (Mop1), codes for an RNA-processing enzyme that is necessary for making the small RNAs that are responsible for silencing the transposon MuDR. A second gene, Mu killer (MuK), is then needed to establish heritable silencing.

=== P elements ===
P elements are a family of transposons that recently proliferated within the genome of Drosophila melanogaster. The P elements have an extremely high transposition rate and induce sterility and abnormal gonad development in D. melanogaster. The flies thus developed a maternally inherited technique for combating the invasive DNA and silencing the transposons, now known as P cytotype. P cytotype detects DNA sequences in areas of telomeric heterochromatin and silences those sequences when they are found elsewhere in the genome. This is referred to as the telomeric-silencing effect (TSE). Just two P elements in the telomere are enough to suppress over 80 other copies of the P element in the genome. The cytoplasmic factor used for TSE builds up over generations and suppression of the transposons is not fully effective unless the fly's female-line ancestors have had the P element for six generations.

== See also ==
- Retrotransposon silencing
