= Pistol ribozyme =

RNA structure that catalyzes its own cleavage at a specific site

The pistol ribozyme is an RNA structure that catalyzes its own cleavage at a specific site. In other words, it is a self-cleaving ribozyme. The pistol ribozyme was discovered through comparative genomic analysis. Subsequent biochemical analysis determined further biochemical characteristics of the ribozyme. This understanding was further advanced by an atomic-resolution crystal structure of a pistol ribozyme

== Discovery ==
Pistol ribozyme was discovered by a bioinformatics strategy as an RNA Associated with Genes Associated with Twister and Hammerhead ribozymes, or RAGATH.

== Physical properties ==
Comparative analysis of 501 unique samples of pistol ribozyme from ribozyme-associated gene classes and bacterial DNA sequences was done to reach a consensus of the physical properties of the pistol ribozyme

=== Sequences ===
10 nucleotides were discovered to be highly conserved amongst many pistol ribozymes: G5, A19, A20, A 21, A31, A32, A33, G40, C41, and G42. Mutation to any of these nucleotides disrupt its secondary structure, which also disrupt its catalytic ability. The scissile bond was also determine to be between G53-U54 located in the junction connecting P2 and P3. Although the identity of these two nucleotides might vary, the length of the junction remains highly conserved.

=== Secondary structure ===
Secondary structure in pistol ribozyme was observed to be highly conserved. There are 3 Watson-Crick base-paired stems: P1, P2, and P3, which are all connected by loops. A pseudoknot interaction exists between the loop of P1 and the junction connecting P2 and P3.

== Catalytic activity ==
=== Mechanism ===
The mechanism for pistol ribozyme was deduced through the identification of the products of the self-cleaving reaction. Through mass spectrometry, it was found that the products contain 5'-hydroxyl and 2',3'-cyclic phosphate functional groups. Reaction mechanism was concluded to involve 2'-OH nucleophilic attack by G53 on the phosphate bond connecting G53-U54. The process involves a trigonal bipyramidal penta-coordinated phosphorus center. N1 on G40 acts a general base in which it activates the nucleophile 2'-OH on G53. G32 acts as a general acid in which it neutralizes the developing negative charge on the intermediate.

=== Kinetics ===
Under physiological pH and magnesium ion concentration, the rate constant of pistol ribozyme self-cleaving reaction was observed to be > 10 min^{−1}. Under optimum condition (pH = 7.0 - 9.0, and magnesium concentration above 50 mM), the rate constant detected to be > 100 min^{−1}. As magnesium concentration increases, the rate of reaction increases but starts to plateau around 50 mM.

=== Metal ions specificity ===
Self-cleaving reactions were observed in the presence of 0.1 mM of various monovalent and divalent metal ions such as magnesium, manganese, calcium, cobalt, nickel, cadmium, barium, sodium, and lithium. This implies that pistol ribozyme possess no specificity in the metal ion required in catalysis.
