= Carboxypeptidase U =

Identifiers
- EC no.: 3.4.17.20
- CAS no.: 156621-18-0

Databases
- IntEnz: IntEnz view
- BRENDA: BRENDA entry
- ExPASy: NiceZyme view
- KEGG: KEGG entry
- MetaCyc: metabolic pathway
- PRIAM: profile
- PDB structures: RCSB PDB PDBe PDBsum
Search
- PMC: articles
- PubMed: articles
- NCBI: proteins

Carboxypeptidase U (EC 3.4.17.20, arginine carboxypeptidase, carboxypeptidase R, plasma carboxypeptidase B, thrombin-activatable fibrinolysis inhibitor) is an enzyme. This enzyme catalyses the following chemical reaction

Release of C-terminal Arg and Lys from a polypeptide

Pro-carboxypeptidase U in (human) plasma is activated by thrombin or plasmin during clotting to form the unstable carboxypeptidase U.

== See also ==
- Carboxypeptidase
