= Hairpin ribozyme =

Enzymatic section of RNA

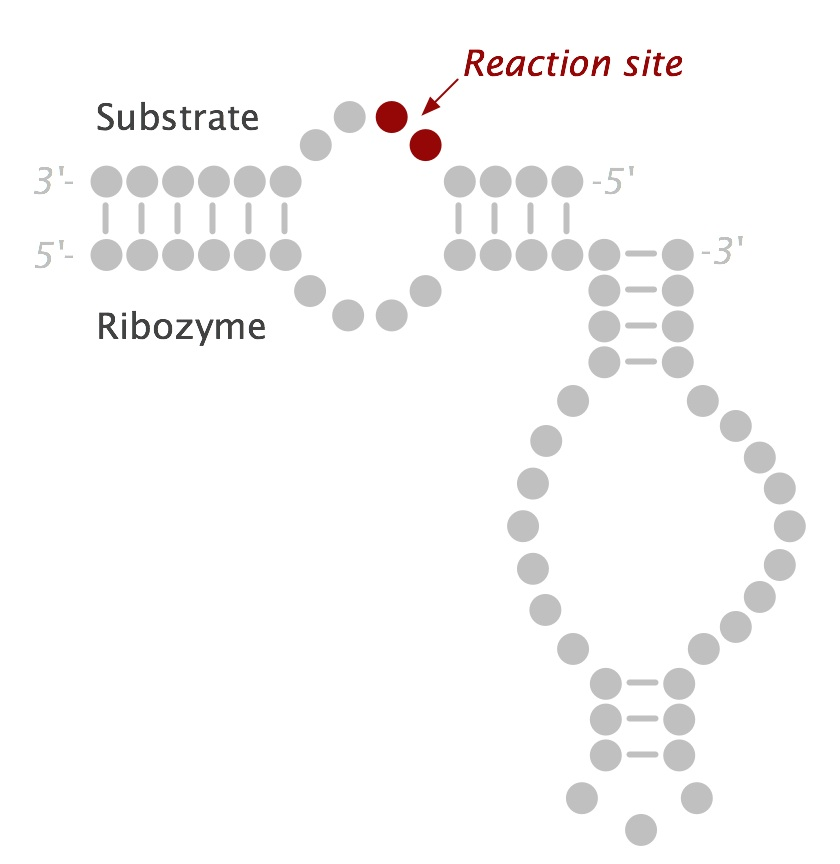
Secondary structure of a minimal hairpin ribozyme with substrate RNA bound. Circles represent individual nucleotides and lines indicate canonical (Watson-Crick) base pairs

The hairpin ribozyme is a small section of RNA that can act as a ribozyme. Like the hammerhead ribozyme it is found in RNA satellites of plant viruses. It was first identified in the minus strand of the tobacco ringspot virus (TRSV) satellite RNA where it catalyzes self-cleavage and joining (ligation) reactions to process the products of rolling circle virus replication into linear and circular satellite RNA molecules. The hairpin ribozyme is similar to the hammerhead ribozyme in that it does not require a metal ion for the reaction.

== Biological function ==
The hairpin ribozyme is an RNA motif that catalyzes RNA processing reactions essential for replication of the satellite RNA molecules in which it is embedded. These reactions are self-processing, i.e. a molecule rearranging its own structure. Both cleavage and end joining reactions are mediated by the ribozyme motif, leading to a mixture of interconvertible linear and circular satellite RNA molecules. These reactions are important for processing the large multimeric RNA molecules that are generated by rolling circle replication. At the end of the replication cycle, these large intermediates of satellite RNA replication are processed down to unit length molecules (circular or linear) before they can be packaged by viruses and carried to other cells for further rounds of replication.

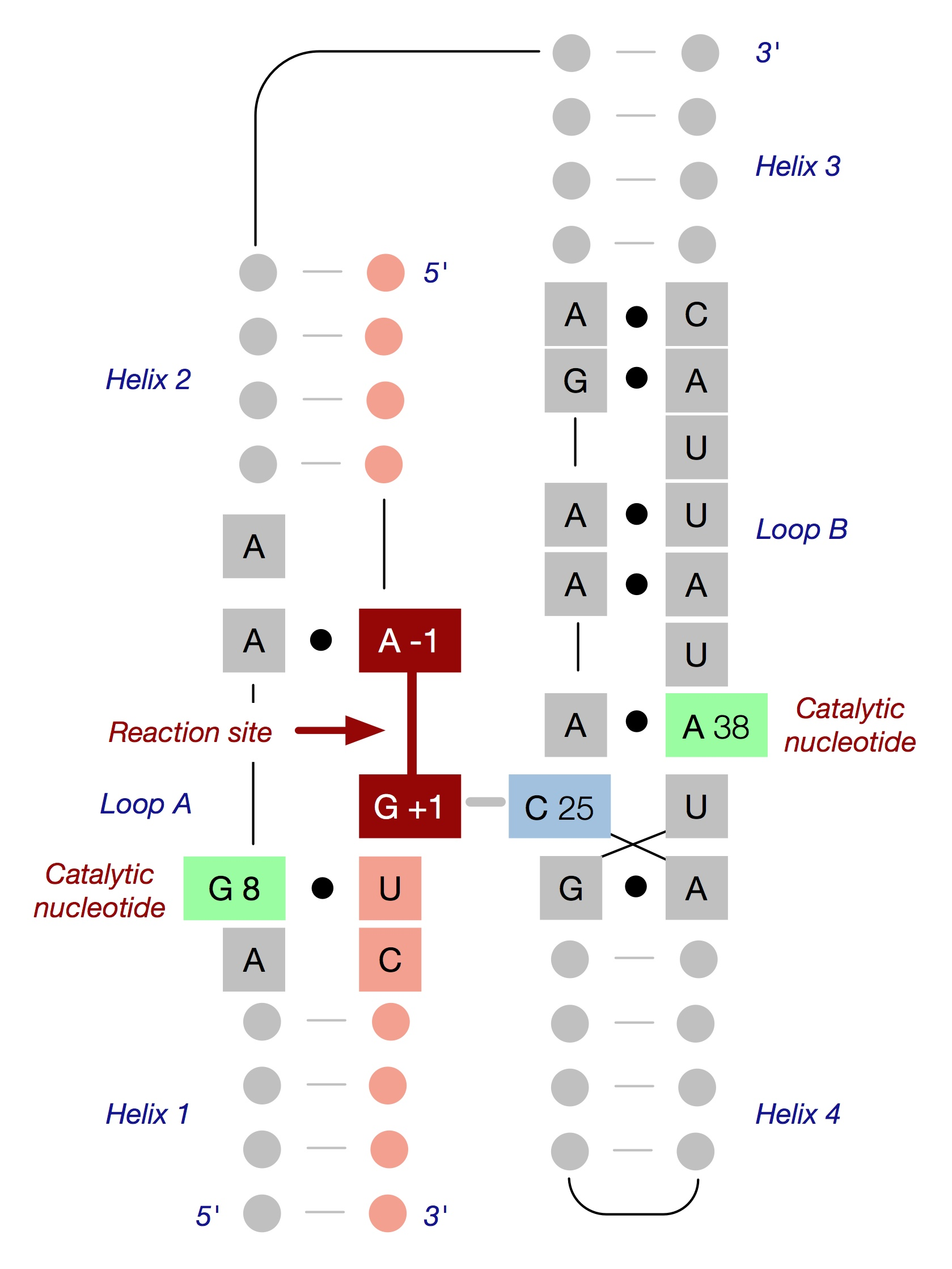
Folding of the hairpin ribozyme in its native tertiary structure. The ribozyme sequence is shown in grey, whilst the substrate sequence is light red. The cleavage and ligation site (dark red) is between nucleotides A-1 and G+1. Important sequences within loops A and B are shown, with black dots indicating non-Watson-Crick interactions between nucleotides. The two catalytic nucleotides are shown in green, and the critical nucleotide C25, which forms a Watson-Crick base pair with G+1 at the reaction site, is shown in blue.

== Natural versions of the hairpin ribozyme ==
In the 1980s, the hairpin ribozyme was identified in 3 naturally occurring and well-characterized sequences:

- satellite RNA of tobacco ringspot virus (sTRSV)
- satellite RNA of chicory yellow mottle virus (sCYMV)
- satellite RNA of arabis mosaic virus (sARMV)

Later work in 2021 revealed almost 1000 hairpin ribozyme sequences in largely unknown organisms found in metatranscriptome data. These newer sequences were hypothesized to occur in organisms that, like those containing the three previously found hairpin ribozymes, use single-stranded, circular RNA genomes. The circularity of the genomes was supported experimentally, but the further nature of the organisms is not yet well studied.

== Artificial versions of the hairpin ribozyme ==
Smaller artificial versions of the hairpin ribozyme have been developed to enable a more detailed experimental analysis of the molecule. This is a commonly used strategy for separating those parts of a self-processing RNA molecule that are essential for the RNA processing reactions from those parts which serve unrelated functions. Through this process, a 50 nucleotide minimal catalytic domain and a 14 nucleotide substrate were identified. Using these artificially derived sequences, a trans-acting ribozyme was developed that can catalyze the cleavage of multiple substrate molecules. This strategy was important in that it allowed investigators to (i) apply biochemical methods for enzymatic analysis, (ii) conduct experiments to identify essential structural elements of the ribozyme-substrate complex, and (iii) develop engineered ribozymes that have been used for biomedical applications, including preventing the replication of pathogenic viruses, and the study of the function of individual genes.

== Reaction chemistry ==
In common with several other ribozymes and protein ribonucleases, the cleavage reaction of the hairpin ribozyme generates RNA fragments with termini consisting of a 2',3'-cyclic phosphate and a 5'-hydroxyl group. The ligation reaction appears to be a simple reversal of cleavage, i.e. covalent joining of RNA fragments ending with a 2',3'-cyclic phosphate and a 5'-hydroxyl group to generate the ordinary 3'-5' phosphodiester linkage used in both RNA and DNA.

Studies of this reaction in multiple ribozymes have served to establish that the reaction chemistry (catalytic mechanism) is an endogenous property of the RNA molecule itself and is not mediated by metal ions, as is true for some protein enzymes and some other ribozymes. Moreover, cleavage activity is still observed when Mg^{2+} is replaced by [Co(NH_{3})_{6}]^{3+}. Co^{3+} binds NH_{3} so tightly in solution that NH_{3} does not dissociate to any appreciable extent, and therefore does not become protonated. This suggests there is no metal-catalyzed proton transfer or direct coordination to the RNA, but instead metals are only required for folding. Furthermore, in crystal structures of a ribozyme-inhibitor complex and a transition state mimic, it was shown that the three-dimensional architecture splays apart A-1 and G+1, positioning the 2'-OH of A-1 for an in-line nucleophilic attack on the scissile phosphate linkage. Additionally, G8, A38, and A9 have been suggested to play roles in the catalysis by deprotonating the 2'-OH of A-1, stabilizing the developing negative charge of the pentacoordinate phosphate oxygens, and protonating the 5'-O leaving group of G+1.

== Structure ==
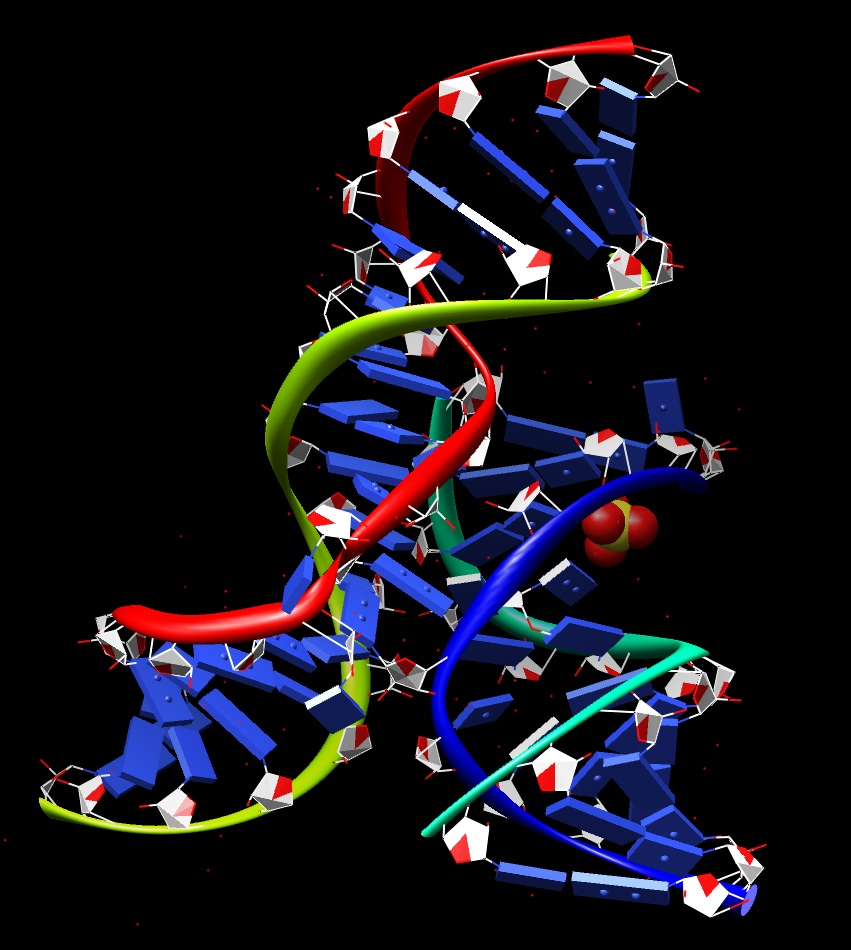
A representation of the 3D structure of the hairpin ribozyme.

The minimal hairpin ribozyme-substrate complex folds into a secondary structure that includes two domains, each consisting of two short base paired helices separated by an internal loop. Domain A (helix 1 – loop A – helix 2) contains the substrate and the primary substrate-recognition region of the ribozyme. Domain B (helix 3 – loop B – helix 4) is larger and contains the primary catalytic determinants of the ribozyme. The two domains are covalently joined via a phosphodiester linkage that connects helix 2 to helix 3. These domains must interact with one another for catalysis to occur.

When the minimal ribozyme-substrate complex is allowed to fold under conditions of low ionic strength, the two domains stack one atop the other, forming an inactive, extended structure that resembles a hairpin. In order for catalysis to occur, the two domains lie parallel to one another in a fold that resembles a paperclip. In various publications, this RNA has been termed either the "paperclip" or "hairpin" ribozyme. Despite the fact that the former name has proven to be more accurate, the latter has become the commonly accepted nomenclature. In the laboratory, a functional interaction between the two domains is promoted by the addition of cations, whose positive charge suffices to overcome the electrostatic repulsion of the negatively charged RNA backbone. In nature, association of the two domains is assisted through a combination of metal ions (including Mg^{2+}) and the presence of two additional helical domains that are not present in the minimal ribozyme-substrate complex but serve to promote proper three-dimensional folding. These additional domains stack upon helices 2 and 3, thereby promoting the association of the two functional domains through what is termed a four-way helical junction.

The structure and activity of the hairpin ribozyme has been explored using a wide range of complementary experimental methods, including nucleotide replacement, functional group substitution, combinatorial selection, fluorescence spectroscopy, covalent crosslinking, NMR analysis and x-ray crystallography. These studies have been facilitated by the ability of the functional complex to self-assemble from segments made by solid phase chemical RNA synthesis, permitting the incorporation of a wide variety of modified nucleotides that are not naturally found in RNA. Together, the results of these experiments present a highly congruent picture of the catalytic cycle, i.e. how the hairpin ribozyme binds its substrate, folds into a specific three-dimensional structure, catalyzes the reaction, and releases the product(s) of the reaction.

== Targeted RNA cleavage and antiviral activity ==
Hairpin ribozymes have been modified in such a way that they can be used to target cleavage of other RNA molecules. This is possible because much of the substrate specificity of the hairpin ribozyme results from simple Watson-Crick base pairing within helices 1 and 2.

One area of particular interest has been the development of hairpin ribozymes for potential therapeutic use, for example by preventing the replication of pathogenic viruses. Antiviral hairpin ribozymes have been generated and expressed within mammalian cells, and cells expressing different engineered ribozymes have been shown to be resistant to infection by HIV-1, hepatitis B, and Sindbis virus.
