= Hepatitis delta virus ribozyme =

Non-coding RNA in hepatitis delta virus

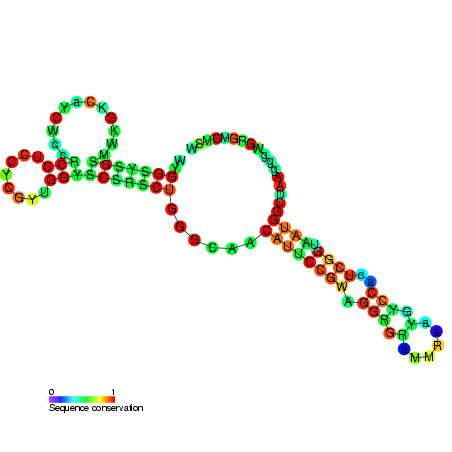
- Predicted secondary structure and sequence conservation of HDV ribozyme

Identifiers
- Symbol: HDV_ribozyme
- Rfam: RF00094

Other data
- RNA type: Gene; ribozyme
- Domain: Viruses
- SO: SO:0000374
- PDB structures: PDBe

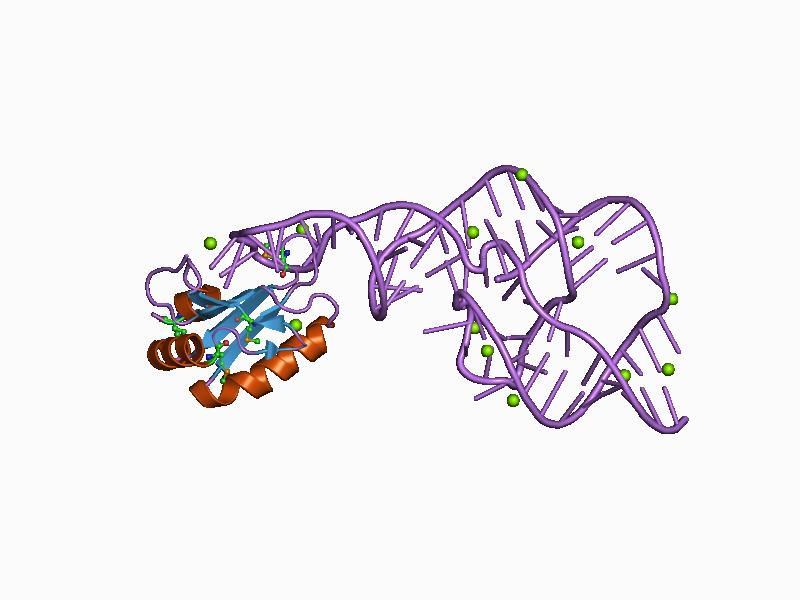
A representation of the 3D structure of the Hepatitis delta virus ribozyme.

The hepatitis delta virus (HDV) ribozyme is a non-coding RNA found in the hepatitis delta virus that is necessary for viral replication. Hepatitis delta virus is the only known human virus that utilizes ribozyme activity to infect its host. The ribozyme acts to process the RNA transcripts to unit lengths in a self-cleavage reaction during replication of the hepatitis delta virus, which is thought to propagate by a double rolling circle mechanism. The ribozyme is active in vivo in the absence of any protein factors and was the fastest known naturally occurring self-cleaving RNA at the time of its discovery.

The crystal structure of this ribozyme has been solved using X-ray crystallography and shows five helical segments connected by a double pseudoknot.

In addition to the sense (genomic version), all HDV viruses also have an antigenomic version of the HDV ribozyme. This version is not the exact complementary sequence but adopts the same structure as the sense (genomic) strand. The only "significant" differences between the two are a small bulge in P4 stem and a shorter J4/2 junction. Both the genomic and antigenomic ribozymes are necessary for replication.

== HDV-like ribozymes ==
The HDV ribozyme is structurally and biochemically related to many other self-cleaving ribozymes. These other ribozymes are often referred to as examples of HDV ribozymes, because of these similarities, even though they are not found in hepatitis delta viruses. They can also be referred to as "HDV-like" to indicate this fact.

HDV-like ribozymes include the mammalian CPEB3 ribozyme, theta ribozymes in bacteriophages, retrotransposons members (e.g. in the R2 RNA element in insects and in the L1Tc and probably other retrotransposons in trypanosomatids) and sequences from bacteria. The grouping is probably a result of convergent evolution: Deltavirus found outside of humans also possess a DV ribozyme, and no horizontal gene transfer scenarios proposed can yet explain this.

== Mechanism of catalysis ==
The HDV ribozyme catalyzes cleavage of the phosphodiester bond between the substrate nucleotide or oligonucleotide and the 5′-hydroxyl of the ribozyme. In the hepatitis delta virus, this substrate nucleotide sequence begins with uridine and is known as U(-1), however, the identity of the -1 nucleotide does not significantly change the rate of catalysis. There is only a requirement for its chemical nature, since as shown by Perrotta and Been, substitution of the U(-1) ribose with deoxyribose abolishes the reaction, which is consistent with the prediction that the 2′-hydroxyl is the nucleophile in the chemical reaction. Hence, unlike many other ribozymes, such as the hammerhead ribozyme, the HDV ribozyme has no upstream requirements for catalysis and requires only a single -1 ribonucleotide as a substrate to efficiently react.

Initially, it was believed that the 75th nucleotide in the ribozyme, a cytosine known as C75, was able to act as a general base with the N3 of C75 abstracting a proton from the 2′-hydroxyl of the U(-1) nucleotide to facilitate nucleophilic attack on the phosphodiester bond. However, although it is well established that the N3 of C75 has a pKa perturbed from its normal value of 4.45 and is closer to about 6.15 or 6.40, it is not neutral enough to act as a general base catalyst. Instead, the N3 of C75 is believed to act as a Lewis acid to stabilize the leaving 5′-hydroxyl of the ribozyme; this is supported by its proximity to the 5′-hydroxyl in the crystal structure. Substitution of the C75 nucleotide with any other nucleotide abolishes or substantially impairs ribozyme activity, although this activity can be partially restored with imidazole, further implicating C75 in catalytic activity.

The C75 in the HDV ribozyme has been the subject of several studies because of its peculiar pKa. The typical pKa values for the free nucleosides are around 3.5 to 4.2; these lower pKa values are acidic and it is unlikely that they would become basic. However, it is likely that the structural environment within the ribozyme, which includes a desolvated active site cleft, provides negative electrostatic potential that could perturb the pKa of cytosine enough to act as a Lewis acid.

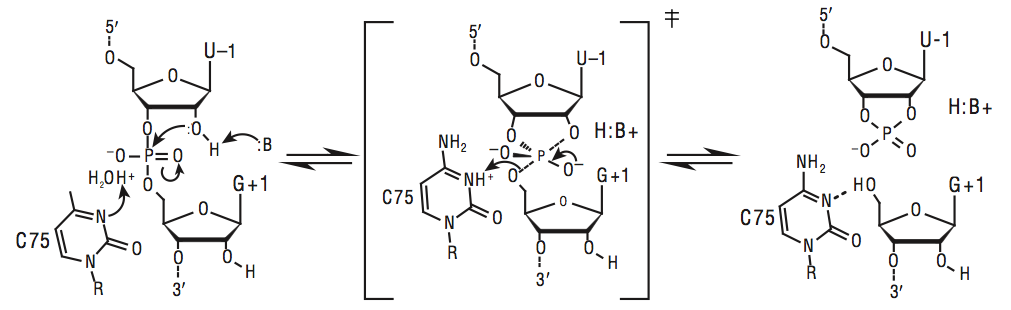
General acid catalysis by cytosine 75, in which the protonated form of the C donates a proton to the leaving group during catalysis

In addition to Lewis acid stabilization of the 5′-hydroxyl leaving group, it is also now accepted that the HDV ribozyme can use a metal ion to assist in activation of the 2′-hydroxyl for attack on the U(-1) nucleotide. A magnesium ion in the active site of the ribozyme is coordinated to the 2’-hydroxyl nucleophile and an oxygen of the scissile phosphate, and may act as a Lewis acid to activate the 2′-hydroxyl. In addition, it is possible that the phosphate of U23 can act as a Lewis acid to accept a proton from the 2′-hydroxyl with the magnesium serving as a coordinating ion. Because the HDV ribozyme does not require metal ions to have activity, it is not an obligate metalloenzyme, but the presence of magnesium in the active site significantly improves the cleavage reaction. The HDV ribozyme does seem to have a nonspecific requirement for low amounts of divalent cations to fold, being active in Mg^{2+}, Ca^{2+}, Mn^{2+}, and Sr^{2+}. In the absence of metal ions, it seems likely that water can replace the role of magnesium as a Lewis acid.

== Regulation by upstream RNA ==
As limited by the rapid self-cleaving nature of HDV ribozyme, the previous ribonuclease experiments were performed on the 3′ product of self-cleavage rather than the precursor. However, flanking sequence is known to participate in regulating the self-cleavage activity of HDV ribozyme. Therefore, the upstream sequence 5′ to the self-cleavage site has been incorporated to study the resultant self-cleavage activity of the HDV ribozyme. Two alternative structures have been identified.

The first inhibitory structure is folded by an extended transcript (i.e. -30/99 transcript, coordinates are referenced against the self-cleavage site) spanning from 30 nt upstream of the cleavage site to 15 nt downstream of the 3′-end. The flanking sequence sequesters the ribozyme in a kinetic trap during transcription and results in the extremely diminished self-cleavage rate. This self-cleavage-preventing structure includes 3 alternative stems: Alt1, Alt2 and Alt3, which disrupt the active conformation. Alt1 is a 10-bp Long-Range-Interaction formed by an inhibitory upstream stretch (-25/-15 nt) and the downstream stretch (76/86 nt). The Alt1 disrupts the stem P2 in the active conformation wherein P2 is proposed to have an activating role for both genomic and antigenomic ribozyme. Alt2 is an interaction between upstream flanking sequence and the ribozyme, and Alt3 is a nonnative ribozyme-ribozyme interaction.

The secondary structure of this inhibitory conformation is supported by various experimental approaches. First, direct probing via ribonucleases was performed and the subsequent modeling via mfold 3.0 using constraints from the probing results agrees with the proposed structure. Second, a series of DNA oligomer complementary to different regions of AS1/2 were used to rescue the ribozyme activity; the results confirms the inhibitory roles of AS1/2. Third, mutational analysis introduces single/double mutations outside the ribozyme to ensure the observed ribozyme activity is directly associated with the stability of the Alt1. The stability of AS1 is found to be inversely related to the self-cleavage activity.

The second permissive structure enables the HDV ribozyme to self-cleave co-transcriptionally and this structure further includes the -54/-18 nt portion of the RNA transcript. The upstream inhibitory -24/-15 stretch from the aforementioned inhibitory conformation is now sequestered in a hairpin P(-1) located upstream of the cleavage site. The P(-1) motif, however, is only found in the genomic sequence, which may be correlated with the phenomenon that genomic HDV RNA copies are more abundant in the infected liver cells. Experimental evidence also supports this alternative structure. First, structural mapping via ribonuclease is used to probe the -54/-1 fragment instead of the whole precursor transcript due to the fast-cleaving nature of this structure, which agrees with the local hairpin P(-1) (between -54/-40 and -18/-30 nt). Secondly, evolutionary conservation is found in P(-1) and the linking region between P(-1) and P1 among 21 genomic HDV RNA isolates.

== Use in RNA transcript preparation ==
The special properties of the HDV ribozyme's cleavage reaction make it a useful tool to prepare RNA transcripts with homogenous 3′ ends, an alternative to transcription of RNA with T7 RNA polymerase than can often produce heterogenous ends or undesired additions. The cDNA version of the ribozyme may be prepared adjacent to cDNA of the target RNA sequence and RNA prepared from transcription with T7 RNA polymerase. The ribozyme sequence will efficiently cleave itself with no downstream requirements, as the -1 nucleotide is invariant, leaving a 2′–3′ cyclic phosphate that can easily be removed by treatment with a phosphatase or T4 polynucleotide kinase. The target RNA can then be purified with gel purification.
