= Lysine carboxypeptidase =

Class of enzymes

Identifiers
- EC no.: 3.4.17.3
- CAS no.: 9013-89-2

Databases
- BRENDA: enzyme data
- ExPASy: NiceZyme view
- KEGG: enzyme entry
- MetaCyc: metabolic pathway
- Rhea: reactions
- PDB structures: RCSB PDB PDBe PDBsum
Search
- PMC: articles
- PubMed: articles
- NCBI: proteins

Lysine carboxypeptidase (EC 3.4.17.3) is an enzyme. This enzyme catalyses the following chemical reaction:

Release of a C-terminal basic amino acid (lysine or arginine), preferentially lysine.

This is a zinc-activated enzyme found in plasma. It inactivates proteins such as bradykinin and anaphylatoxins in the blood in order to prevent toxic buildup.

== Nomenclature ==
Lysine carboxypeptidase is also known as:

- carboxypeptidase N
- arginine carboxypeptidase
- kininase I
- anaphylatoxin inactivator
- plasma carboxypeptidase B
- creatine kinase conversion factor
- bradykinase
- kininase Ia
- hippuryllysine hydrolase
- bradykinin-decomposing enzyme
- protaminase
- CPase N
- creatinine kinase convertase
- peptidyl-L-lysine(-L-arginine) hydrolase
- CPN

== Classification ==
All enzymes are assigned an Enzyme Commission number based on the chemical reaction they catalyze. An EC number functions to clear up any confusion that arises due to the fact that many enzymes have several different names that can refer to them. Lysine carboxypeptidase's EC number is 3.4.17.3.

The first number in an EC number indicates the main class that the enzyme belongs to (the options being oxidoreductases, transferases, hydrolases, lyases, isomerases, and ligases). Lysine carboxypeptidase belongs to class 3 which indicates that it is a hydrolase. Hydrolases use water to break apart chemical bonds including, but not limited to, carbon-oxygen, carbon-nitrogen, and carbon-carbon bonds.

The second number describes the type of bond that is broken apart in the specific enzyme catalyzed reaction. The "4" places lysine carboxypeptidase in the "peptidase" subclass. This means that this enzyme acts on peptide bonds.

The third number (the sub-subclass) gives more information about the catalytic mechanism of the reaction. Lysine carboxypeptidase is in sub-subclass 17: metallocarboxypeptidases. This subclass first defines lysine carboxypeptidase as an exopeptidase (sub-subclasses 11 and 13-19) which means that it only acts on terminal bonds of a polypeptide chain. It is more specifically a carboxypeptidase (sub-subclasses 16-18) which acts on a C-terminus to break off one amino acid. The overall category of metallocarboxypeptidases indicates that it functions using metal ion catalysis.

The last number in the EC number is simply to differentiate each metallocarboxypeptidase from one another.

== Species distribution ==
Lysine carboxypeptidase can be found in nearly 400 distinct species, all being jawed vertebrates. These species include birds, reptiles, mammals, amphibians, and fish. For simplicity and due to a lack of research of this enzyme in other organisms, the information discussed in this article will be centered around human lysine carboxypeptidase, specifically.

== Structure ==
Lysine carboxypeptidase has a molecular weight of between 270 and 330 kDa (kilodaltons). It is a tetrameric glycoprotein. It is composed of two 83 kDa subunits and two active subunits between 55 kDa and 48 kDa and these are held together by non-covalent interactions.

The 83 kDa subunits are regulatory and do not directly contribute to catalytic activity; they are also heavily glycosylated. These function to stabilize the active subunits and keep them in circulation. Catalytic functioning is retained when the 83 kDa subunits are eliminated from the active subunits, but they are still necessary for their support roles. The active subunits are small and relatively unstable at body temperature and blood pH, so they would not last long in the plasma without the regulatory subunits attached. The 55 kDa-48 kDa portions are both catalytically active.

The primary structure of the 83 kDa subunit can be split into three main domains. The first domain is located at the N-terminus and consists of 52 amino acids with the first 27 being cysteine-rich. The second domain refers to the next 312 amino acids and it consists of 13 leucine-rich repeat (LRR) sections, each made up of 24 residues. The final C-terminal domain refers to the last 145 residues where amino acids 400-425 hold a cysteine-rich section. The secondary/tertiary structure of the subunit has not yet been experimentally determined, but it has been hypothesized based upon how other LRR proteins fold. The working model, which was created using ESyPred3D computer programming, is a horseshoe shape with a β-sheet lining the interior and an α-helix or β-turn lining the exterior. The model also shows an Ig-like domain. In other proteins, the junction between this and the C-terminus of the LRR domain has proven to be a binding site for tetramer formation. Therefore, this may be the binding site for the second 83 kDa subunit of the enzyme, while the active subunit is thought to interact on the interior of the horseshoe shape.

The catalytic subunit is shaped like a pear. Its first domain at the N-terminus is spherical and consists of 319 amino acids. It also contains the catalytic and substrate binding areas and is thus referred to as the carboxypeptidase domain. This domain consists of two disulfide bridges, which leaves one unpaired cysteine which extends into the interior portion of the molecule. It has a central 8 stranded β-sheet which is surrounded by 9 α-helices which, in general, run antiparallel to the sheets. The domain has a mostly hydrophobic core. The second C-terminus domain is cylinder-shaped and made up of 79 residues. It is a β-sandwich transthyretin (TT) domain with a hydrophobic core. It was previously thought that the active unit was not glycosylated; however, the structure shows three residues O-linked to N-acetyl-glucosamines. The area that binds to the regulatory subunit was determined to be the interface between these two domains. There is a hydrophobic patch on this area that is thought to interact with the interior of the horseshoe shape of the 83 kDa subunit to form the heterodimer.

== Active site ==
The spherical carboxypeptidase domain of the catalytic subunit has a circular indentation in the surface which is the location of the active-site groove. The base of the groove is formed by 3 β-sheets while the walls of the groove are lined with α-helices. The electron density in the middle of the groove allows a space for the zinc ion cofactor to bind. The P1' residue of the substrate is placed in a specific cavity (S1') of the active-site groove while the P1 residues and on extend into a mostly hydrophobic area of the groove (in pockets S1, S2, etc.). The scissile peptide bond is held in place with several polar interactions between protein side groups. The nitrogen atom on the C-terminal side is anchored to the nearby guanidine groups of arginine molecules. On the N-terminal side, the nitrogen atom is held by hydrogen bonds with tyrosine while the carbonyl group is held by hydrogen bonds with lysine. These interactions stretch the peptide bond and set it up for the water molecule to break it apart. While there are technically two active sites on the tetramer, one on each active subunit, only one active site can be used at a time.

== Structure-function relationship ==
The structure of lysine carboxypeptidase can explain its preferences for the P1' and P1 residues. The aspartic acid (its orientation determined by the cis-peptide bond between the adjacent proline and tyrosine) that is located near the S1' pocket of the active site is responsible for the preference of lysine over arginine as the P1' residue. Unlike arginine, lysine can approach this area frontally which sets the peptide bond up for an easier break. Meanwhile, the phenolic side chains near pocket S1 cause the enzyme to prefer more medium sized P1 residues over larger ones; this reduces the amount of shifting that needs to occur. This explains the enzyme's preference of alanine and methionine over glycine.

== Catalytic mechanism ==
Lysine carboxypeptidase is produced exclusively in the liver and then is secreted into the blood shortly after. It functions best in an environment with neutral pH.

The enzyme functions to break off arginine or lysine from the C-terminal of a polypeptide chain. Lysine is hydrolyzed more readily because it has a quicker turnover rate than arginine. The penultimate amino acid also contributes to the ease at which the reaction proceeds. Alanine and methionine result in the most efficient reactions while glycine significantly reduces reaction speed.

Lysine carboxypeptidase utilizes metal ion catalysis in order to complete its reaction and has zinc (or another divalent cation like cobalt) as a necessary cofactor. Because of this, its actions can be inhibited by chelating factors which would remove the zinc from the enzyme complex.

Zinc is bound to the active site of the enzyme and acts as a stabilizer. The positive charge of the zinc allows it to interact with the partial negative charge of the oxygen in a water molecule and form a bond. A nearby base will remove one of the hydrogens off of the oxygen molecule to stabilize it. Now, it can effectively act as a nucleophile; it will attack the carbonyl group of the protein to form a temporary tetrahedral. After some energetically favorable electron reconfiguration occurs, the result will be the terminal amino acid being cleaved off from the remainder of the polypeptide chain.

== Applications ==
Lysine carboxypeptidase is found within the plasma and is used to inactivate certain proteins; this functions to protect the body from potent molecules that may escape from tissues. The most well-studied protein that is inactivated by this enzyme is bradykinin (along with other kinins such as kallidin) which contributes to inflammation and blood pressure regulation. However, the primary way bradykinin is degraded is by angiotensin I converting enzyme (ACE). Lysine carboxypeptidase is still important nonetheless, especially if a patient is receiving ACE inhibitors to treat a condition. Kinins are most often autocrine or paracrine hormones and are thus often restricted in location. If too much of the hormone escapes into the blood and levels rise too high, this can have harmful effects on the body. Lysine carboxypeptidase prevents this from happening.

This enzyme has also proven to be important in inactivating anaphylatoxins which are inflammation-inducing proteins used in immune responses. Similarly to kinins, harmful effects can occur if too much of these proteins accumulate in the blood. Other molecules that this enzyme is involved in modifying, and consequently regulating, include creatine kinase, hemoglobin, stromal cell-derived factor-1α (SDF-1α), plasminogen receptors, and enkephalins. The enzymatic interaction with creatine kinase releases one lysine from each of two subunits and modifies its function. With hemoglobin, it speeds up the dissociation of the tetramer into dimers and increases its oxygen affinity. As for SDF-1α, the release of lysine decreases its ability to function, so this enzyme acts as a regulator of activity; SDF-1α is normally important in hematopoietic stem cell trafficking. For plasminogen receptors, cleaving lysine prevents plasminogen's activation into plasmin. Lysine carboxypeptidase regulates enkephalin by reducing its affinity for kappa opioid receptors and consequently making it delta receptor specific. It is also suspected that epidermal growth factor (and possibly other growth factors), acts as a substrate since it is metabolized by the cleavage of C-terminal arginine. Other lesser studied substrates include fibrinopeptides which are involved in blood clotting.

This enzyme is extremely important for proper functioning of the body. There are no records of a person who is completely missing lysine carboxypeptidase and lower than normal levels of the enzyme have been linked to disorders such as angioneurotic edema.
