= Scissile bond =

In molecular biology, a scissile bond is a covalent chemical bond that can be broken by an enzyme. Examples would be the cleaved bond in the self-cleaving hammerhead ribozyme or the peptide bond of a substrate cleaved by a peptidase.
