= Hammerhead ribozyme =

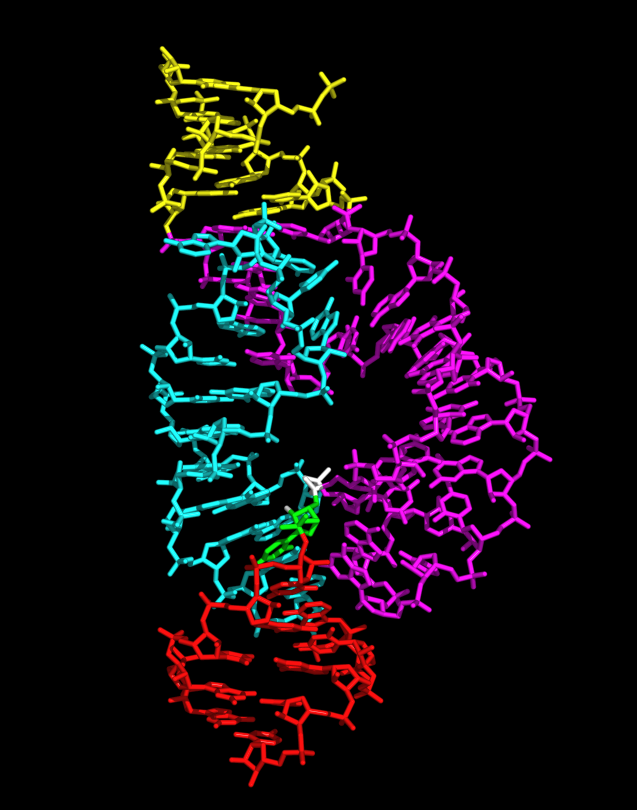
Stylized rendering of the full-length hammerhead ribozyme RNA molecule

The hammerhead ribozyme is an RNA motif that catalyzes reversible cleavage and ligation reactions at a specific site within an RNA molecule. It is one of several catalytic RNAs (ribozymes) known to occur in nature. It serves as a model system for research on the structure and properties of RNA, and is used for targeted RNA cleavage experiments, some with proposed therapeutic applications. Named for the resemblance of early secondary structure diagrams to a hammerhead shark, hammerhead ribozymes were originally discovered in two classes of plant virus-like RNAs: satellite RNAs and viroids. They are also known in some classes of retrotransposons, including the retrozymes. The hammerhead ribozyme motif has been ubiquitously reported in lineages across the tree of life.

The self-cleavage reactions, first reported in 1986, are part of a rolling circle replication mechanism. The hammerhead sequence is sufficient for self-cleavage and acts by forming a conserved three-dimensional tertiary structure.

== Catalysis ==
In its natural state, a hammerhead RNA motif is a single strand of RNA. Although the cleavage takes place in the absence of protein enzymes, the hammerhead RNA itself is not a catalyst in its natural state, as it is consumed by the reaction (i.e. performs self-cleavage) and therefore cannot catalyze multiple turnovers.

Trans-acting hammerhead constructs can be engineered such that they consist of two interacting RNA strands, with one strand composing a hammerhead ribozyme that cleaves the other strand. The strand that gets cleaved can be supplied in excess, and multiple turnover can be demonstrated and shown to obey Michaelis-Menten kinetics, typical of protein enzyme kinetics. Such constructs are typically employed for in vitro experiments, and the term "hammerhead RNA" has become in practice synonymous with the more frequently used "hammerhead ribozyme".

The minimal trans-acting hammerhead ribozyme sequence that is catalytically active consists of three base-paired stems flanking a central core of 15 conserved (mostly invariant) nucleotides, as shown. The conserved central bases, with few exceptions, are essential for ribozyme's catalytic activity. Such hammerhead ribozyme constructs exhibit in vitro a turnover rate (k_{cat}) of about 1 molecule/minute and a K_{m} on the order of 10 nanomolar.

The hammerhead ribozyme is a thoroughly characterized ribozyme. Its small size, investigated cleavage chemistry, known crystal structure, and its biological relevance make the hammerhead ribozyme particularly appropriate for biochemical and biophysical investigations into the fundamental nature of RNA catalysis.

Hammerhead ribozymes may play an important role as therapeutic agents; as enzymes which tailor defined RNA sequences, as biosensors, and for applications in functional genomics and gene discovery.

== Species distribution ==
Hammerhead ribozyme HH9
- Predicted secondary structure and sequence conservation of the HH9 ribozyme found conserved from lizard to human genomes

Identifiers
- Symbol: HH9
- Rfam: RF02275

Other data
- RNA type: Gene; ribozyme
- Domain: Eukaryota
- SO: SO:0000380
- PDB structures: PDBe

In 1986, the first hammerhead ribozymes were found in RNA plant pathogens like viroids and viral satellites. One year later, a hammerhead ribozyme was also reported in the satellite DNA of newt genomes. New examples of this ribozyme were then found in the genomes of unrelated organisms like schistosomes, cave crickets, Arabidopsis thaliana and a few mammals like rodents and the platypus. In 2010, it was found that the hammerhead ribozyme occurs in a wide variety of bacterial and eukaryotic genomes, including in humans. Similar reports confirmed and extended these observations, unveiling the hammerhead ribozyme as a ubiquitous catalytic RNA in all life kingdoms.

Most eukaryotic hammerhead ribozymes are related to a kind of short interspersed retroelements (SINEs) called retrozymes, which express as small circular RNAs. However, an exceptional group of strikingly conserved hammerheads can be found in the genomes of all amniotes. These hammerhead ribozymes (the so-called HH9 and HH10) occur in the introns of a few specific genes and point to a preserved biological role during pre-mRNA biosynthesis. In 2021, novel Hepatitis D virus genomes of circular RNA from diverse animals were found to encode hammerhead ribozymes similar to those present in plant viroids and viral satellites. A massive bioinformatic search of deltavirus-like agents around the globe has uncovered hundreds of examples of circular RNA genomes carrying hammerhead motifs, indicating that not only this ribozyme but small circular RNAs with ribozymes are ubiquitous molecules in the biosphere.

== Chemistry of catalysis ==
The hammerhead ribozyme carries out a very simple chemical reaction that results in the breakage of the substrate strand of RNA, specifically at C17, the cleavage-site nucleotide. Although RNA cleavage is often referred to as hydrolysis, the mechanism employed does not in fact involve the addition of water. Rather, the cleavage reaction is simply an isomerization that consists of rearrangement of the linking phosphodiester bond. It is the same reaction, chemically, that occurs with random base-mediated RNA degradation, except that it is highly site-specific and the rate is accelerated 10,000-fold or more.

=== Cleavage by phosphodiester isomerization ===
In-line transition-state for the hammerhead ribozyme reaction. A general base (B) abstracts a proton from the 2'-O, and a general acid (A), supplies a proton to the 5'-O leaving group as negative charge accumulates. The reaction product is a 2',3'-cyclic phosphate. The bonds breaking (shown in red) and forming (dashed lines) must be in the axial positions and reside approximately 180° apart, as shown. Electron movements are represented by curly arrows.

The cleavage reaction is a phosphodiester isomerization reaction that is initiated by abstraction of the cleavage-site ribose 2'-hydroxyl proton from the 2'-oxygen, which then becomes the attacking nucleophile in an "in-line" or S_{N}2(P)-like reaction, although it is not known whether this proton is removed prior to or during the chemical step of the hammerhead cleavage reaction. (The cleavage reaction is technically not bimolecular, but behaves in the same way a genuine S_{N}2(P) reaction does; it undergoes inversion of configuration subsequent to forming an associative transition-state consisting of a pentacoordinated oxyphosphrane.) The attacking and leaving group oxygens will both occupy the two axial positions in the trigonal bipyramidal transition-state structure as is required for an S_{N}2-like reaction mechanism.

The 5'-product, as a result of this cleavage reaction mechanism, possesses a 2',3'-cyclic phosphate terminus, and the 3'-product possesses a 5'-OH terminus, as with nonenzymatic alkaline cleavage of RNA. The reaction is therefore reversible, as the scissile phosphate remains a phosphodiester, and may thus act as a substrate for hammerhead RNA-mediated ligation without a requirement for ATP or a similar exogenous energy source. The hammerhead ribozyme-catalyzed reaction, unlike the formally identical non-enzymatic alkaline cleavage of RNA, is a highly sequence-specific cleavage reaction with a typical turnover rate of approximately 1 molecule of substrate per molecule of enzyme per minute at pH 7.5 in 10 mM Mg^{2+} (so-called "standard reaction conditions" for the minimal hammerhead RNA sequence), depending upon the sequence of the particular hammerhead ribozyme construct measured. This represents an approximately 10,000-fold rate enhancement over the nonenzymatic cleavage of RNA.

=== Requirement for divalent metal ions ===
All ribozymes were originally thought to be metallo-enzymes. It was assumed that divalent metal ions like Mg^{2+} were thought to have two roles: Promote proper folding of RNA and to form the catalytic core. Since RNA itself did not contain enough variation in the functional groups, metal ions were thought to play a role at the active site, as was known about proteins. The proposed mechanism for the Mg2+ ion was: the deprotonation of the 2'-OH group by a Magnesium.aqua.hydroxy complex bound by the pro-R oxygen at the phosphate-cleavage site, followed by nucleophilic attack of the resultant 2'-alkaoxide on the scissile phosphate forming a pentacoordinate phosphate intermediate. The last step is the departing of the 5' leaving group, yielding a 2',3'-cyclic phosphate with an inverted configuration.

It was presumed that hexahydrated magnesium ions, which exist in equilibrium with magnesium hydroxide, could play the roles of general acid and general base, in a way analogous to those played by two histidines in RNase A. An additional role for divalent metal ions has also been proposed in the form of electrostatic stabilization of the transition-state.

=== Not a metallo-enzyme ===
In 1998 it was discovered that the hammerhead ribozyme, as well as the VS ribozyme and hairpin ribozyme, do not require the presence of metal ions for catalysis, provided a sufficiently high concentration of monovalent cation is present to permit the RNA to fold. This discovery suggested that the RNA itself, rather than serving as an inert, passive scaffold for the binding of chemically active divalent metal ions, is instead itself intimately involved in the chemistry of catalysis. The latest structural results, described below, indeed confirm that two invariant nucleotides, G12 and G8, are positioned consistent with roles as the general base and general acid in the hammerhead cleavage reaction.

Strictly speaking, therefore, the hammerhead ribozyme cannot be a metallo-enzyme.

== Primary and secondary structure ==
Secondary structures and sequences of the minimal (A) and full-length (B) hammerhead ribozymes. Conserved and invariant nucleotides are shown explicitly. Watson-Crick base-paired helical stems are represented as ladder-like drawings. The red arrow depicts the cleavage site, 3' to C17, on each construct.

=== Minimal ribozyme ===
The minimal hammerhead sequence that is required for the self-cleavage reaction includes approximately 13 conserved or invariant "core" nucleotides, most of which are not involved in forming canonical Watson-Crick base-pairs. The core region is flanked by Stems I, II and III, which are in general made of canonical Watson-Crick base-pairs but are otherwise not constrained with respect to sequence. The catalytic turnover rate of minimal hammerhead ribozymes is ~ 1/min (a range of 0.1/min to 10/min is commonly observed, depending upon the nonconserved sequences and the lengths of the three helical stems) under standard reaction conditions of high Mg^{2+} (~10 mM), pH 7.5 and 25 °C. Much of the experimental work carried out on hammerhead ribozymes has used a minimal construct.

==== Type I, type II and type III hammerhead RNA ====
Hammerhead ribozyme (type I)
- Predicted secondary structure and sequence conservation of Hammerhead_1

Identifiers
- Symbol: Hammerhead_1
- Rfam: RF00163

Other data
- RNA type: Gene; ribozyme
- Domain(s): Viroids; Eukaryota
- SO: SO:0000380
- PDB structures: PDBe

Hammerhead ribozyme (type III)
- Predicted secondary structure and sequence conservation of Hammerhead ribozyme (type III)

Identifiers
- Symbol: Hammerhead_3
- Rfam: RF00008

Other data
- RNA type: Gene; ribozyme
- Domain(s): Viroids; Eukaryota
- SO: SO:0000380
- PDB structures: PDBe

Structurally the hammerhead ribozyme is composed of three base paired helices, separated by short linkers of conserved sequences. These helices are called I, II and III. Hammerhead ribozymes can be classified into three types based on which helix the 5' and 3' ends are found in. If the 5' and 3' ends of the sequence contribute to stem I then it is a type I hammerhead ribozyme, to stem II is a type II and to stem III then it is a type III hammerhead ribozyme. Of the three possible topological types, type I can be found in the genomes of prokaryotes, eukaryotes and RNA plant pathogens, whereas type II have been only described in prokaryotes and type III are mostly found in plants, plant pathogens and prokaryotes.

=== Full-length ribozyme ===
The full-length hammerhead ribozyme consists of additional sequence elements in stems I and II that permit additional tertiary contacts to form. The tertiary interactions stabilize the active conformation of the ribozyme, resulting in cleavage rates up to 1000-fold greater than those for corresponding minimal hammerhead sequences.

== Tertiary structure ==
=== Minimal ===
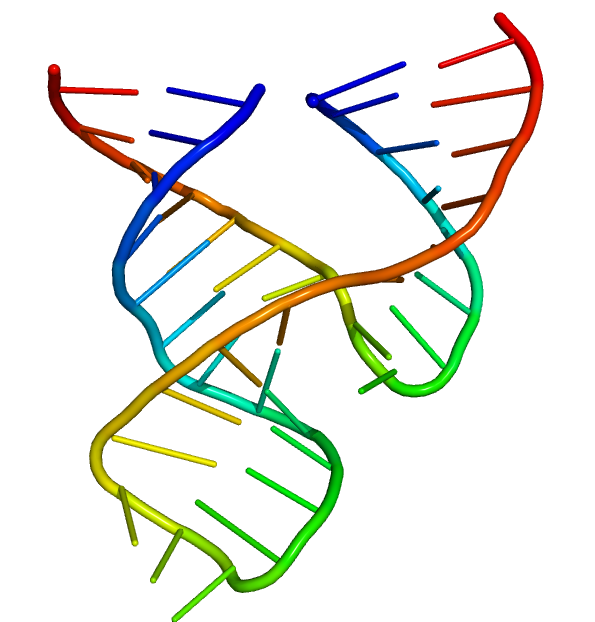
The crystal structure of a minimal hammerhead ribozyme

The minimal hammerhead ribozyme has been exhaustively studied by biochemists and enzymologists as well as by X-ray crystallographers, NMR spectroscopists, and other practitioners of biophysical techniques. The first detailed three-dimensional structural information for a hammerhead ribozyme appeared in 1994 in the form of an X-ray crystal structure of a hammerhead ribozyme bound to a DNA substrate analogue, published in Nature by Pley, Flaherty and McKay. Subsequently, an all-RNA minimal hammerhead ribozyme structure was published by Scott, Finch and Klug in Cell in early 1995.

The minimal hammerhead ribozyme is composed of three base paired helices, separated by short linkers of conserved sequence as shown in the crystal structure. These helices are called I, II and III. The conserved uridine-turn links helix I to helix II and usually contains the sequence CUGA. Helix II and III are linked by a sequence GAAA. The cleavage reaction occurs between helix III and I, and is usually a C.

The structure of a full-length ribozyme shows that there are extensive interactions between the loop of stem II and stem I.

Similar structures are observed in other ribozymes such as hatchet ribozymes.

=== Structure-function ===
Despite the observations of hammerhead ribozyme catalysis in a crystal of the minimal hammerhead sequence in which the crystal lattice packing contacts by necessity confined the global positions of the distal termini of all three flanking helical stems, many biochemical experiments designed to probe transition-state interactions and the chemistry of catalysis appeared to be irreconcilable with the crystal structures.

For example, the invariant core residues G5, G8, G12 and C3 in the minimal hammerhead ribozyme were each observed to be so fragile that changing even a single exocyclic functional group on any one of these nucleotides results in a dramatic reduction or abolition of catalytic activity, yet few of these appeared to form hydrogen bonds involving the Watson-Crick faces of these nucleotide bases in any of the minimal hammerhead structures, apart from a G-5 interaction in the product structure.

A particularly striking and only recently observed example consisted of G8 and G12, which were identified as possible participants in acid/base catalysis. Once it was demonstrated that the hammerhead RNA does not require divalent metal ions for catalysis, it gradually became apparent that the RNA itself, rather than passively bound divalent metal ions, must play a direct chemical role in any acid-base chemistry in the hammerhead ribozyme active site. It was however completely unclear how G12 and G8 could accomplish this, given the original structures of the minimal hammerhead ribozyme.

Other concerns included an NOE between U4 and U7 of the cleaved hammerhead ribozyme that had also been observed during NMR characterization, which suggested that these nucleotide bases must approach one another closer than about 6 Å, although close approach of U7 to U4 did not appear to be possible from the crystal structure. Finally, as previously discussed, the attacking nucleophile in the original structures, the 2'-OH of C17, was not in a position amenable to in-line attack upon the adjacent scissile phosphate.

Perhaps most worrisome were experiments that suggested the A-9 and scissile phosphates must come within about 4 Å of one another in the transition-state, based upon double phosphorothioate substitution and soft metal ion rescue experiments; the distance between these phosphates in the minimal hammerhead crystal structure was about 18 Å, with no clear mechanism for close approach if the Stem II and Stem I A-form helices were treated as rigid bodies. Taken together, these results appeared to suggest that a fairly large-scale conformational change must have taken place in order to reach the transition-state within the minimal hammerhead ribozyme structure.

For these reasons, the two sets of experiments (biochemical vs. crystallographic) appeared not only to be at odds, but to be completely and hopelessly irreconcilable, generating a substantial amount of discord in the field. No compelling evidence for dismissing either set of experimental results was ever made successfully, although many claims to the contrary were made in favor of each.

=== Full-length ===
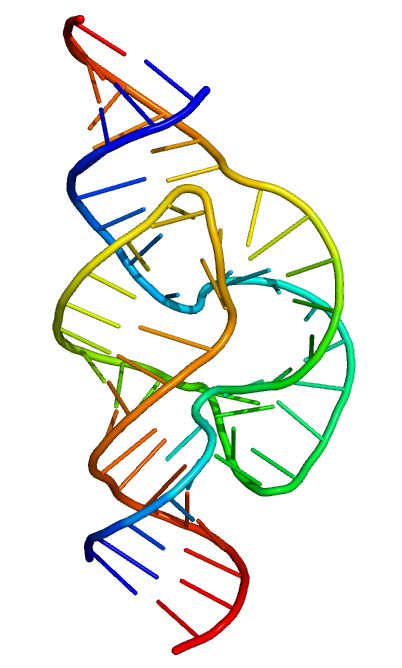
Three-dimensional structure of the full-length hammerhead ribozyme

In 2006 a 2.2 Å resolution crystal structure of the full-length hammerhead ribozyme was obtained. This new structure (shown on the right) appears to resolve the most worrisome of the previous discrepancies. In particular, C17 is now positioned for in-line attack, and the invariant residues C3, G5, G8 and G12 all appear involved in vital interactions relevant to catalysis. Moreover, the A9 and scissile phosphates are observed to be 4.3 Å apart, consistent with the idea that, when modified, these phosphates could bind a single thiophilic metal ion. The structure also reveals how two invariant residues, G-12 and G-8, are positioned within the active site consistent with their previously proposed role in acid/base catalysis. G12 is within hydrogen bonding distance to the 2'–O of C17, the nucleophile in the cleavage reaction, and the ribose of G8 hydrogen bonds to the leaving group 5'-O. (see below), while the nucleotide base of G8 forms a Watson-Crick pair with the invariant C3. This arrangement permits one to suggest that G12 is the general base in the cleavage reaction, and that G8 may function as the general acid, consistent with previous biochemical observations. G5 hydrogen bonds to the furanose oxygen of C17, helping to position it for in-line attack. U4 and U7, as a consequence of the base-pair formation between G8 and C3, are now positioned such that an NOE between their bases is easily explained.

The crystal structure of the full-length hammerhead ribozyme thus clearly addresses all of the major concerns that appeared irreconcilable with the previous crystal structures of the minimal hammerhead ribozyme.

== Structure and catalysis ==
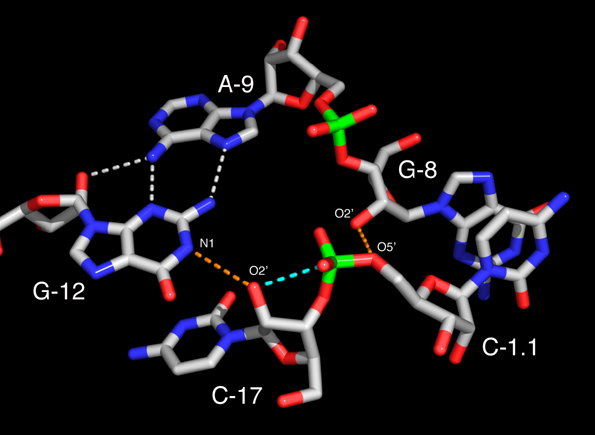
The active site of the full-length hammerhead ribozyme. G12 is positioned consistent with a role as a general base in the cleavage reaction, and the 2'-OH of G8 is positioned for acid catalysis. Potentially "active" hydrogen bonds are shown as orange dotted lines. The 2'-O of C17 is shown to be aligned for nucleophilic attack along the blue dotted line trajectory.

The tertiary interactions in the full-length hammerhead ribozyme stabilize what strongly appears to be the active conformation. The nucleophile, the 2'-oxygen of the cleavage-site nucleotide, C17, is aligned almost perfectly for an in-line attack (the S_{N}2(P) reaction). G12 is positioned within hydrogen bonding distance of this nucleophile, and therefore would be able to abstract a proton from the 2'-oxygen if G12 itself becomes deprotonated. The 2'-OH of G8 forms a hydrogen bond to the 5'-leaving group oxygen, and therefore potentially may supply a proton as negative charge accumulates on the 5'-oxygen of the ribose of A1.1.

The most likely explanation is then that G12, in the deprotonated form, is the general base, and the ribose of G8 is the general acid. The apparent kinetic pKa of the hammerhead ribozyme is 8.5, whereas the pKa of guanosine is about 9.5. It is possible that the pKa of G12 is perturbed from 9.5 to 8.5 in the hammerhead catalytic core; this hypothesis is currently the subject of intense investigation.

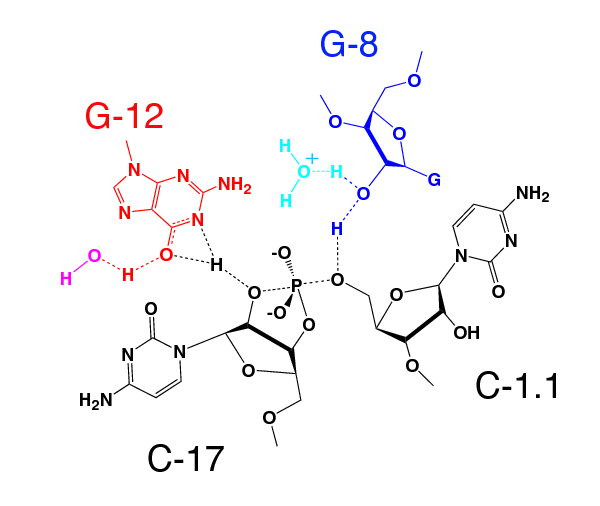
Possible transition-state interactions as extrapolated from the crystal structure.

If the invariant G8 is changed to C8, hammerhead catalysis is abolished. However, a G8C + C3G double-mutant that maintains the G8-C3 base pair found in the full-length hammerhead restores most of the catalytic activity. The 2'-OH of G8 has also been observed to be essential for catalysis; replacement of G8 with deoxyG8 greatly reduces the rate of catalysis, suggesting the 2'-OH is indeed crucial to the catalytic mechanism.

The close approach of the A9 and scissile phosphates requires the presence of a high concentration of positive charge. This is probably the source of the observation that divalent metal ions are required at low ionic strength, but can be dispensed with at higher concentrations of monovalent cations.

The reaction thus likely involves abstraction of the 2'-proton from C17, followed by nucleophilic attack upon the adjacent phosphate. As the bond between the scissile phosphorus and the 5'-O leaving group begins to break, a proton is supplied from the ribose of G8, which then likely reprotonates at the expense of a water molecule observed to hydrogen bond to it in the crystal structure.

== Therapeutic applications ==
Modified hammerhead ribozymes are being tested as therapeutic agents. Synthetic RNAs containing sequences complementary to the mutant SOD1 mRNA and sequences necessary to form the hammerhead catalytic structure are being studied as a possible therapy for amyotrophic lateral sclerosis. Work is also underway to find out whether they could be used to engineer HIV-resistant lines of T-cells. Modified hammerhead ribozyme adenoviruses have been shown to be potent in treating cancer both in vitro and in vivo.

The therapeutic use of trans-cleaving hammerhead ribozymes has been severely hampered by its low-level activity in vivo. The true catalytic potential of trans-cleaving hammerhead ribozymes may be recouped in vivo and therapeutic derivatives are likely to complement other nucleic acid hybridizing therapeutic strategies. Already there are hammerhead ribozymes which are close to clinical application.
