= Phosphodiester bond =

–O– linkage between phosphoric acid and two other compounds

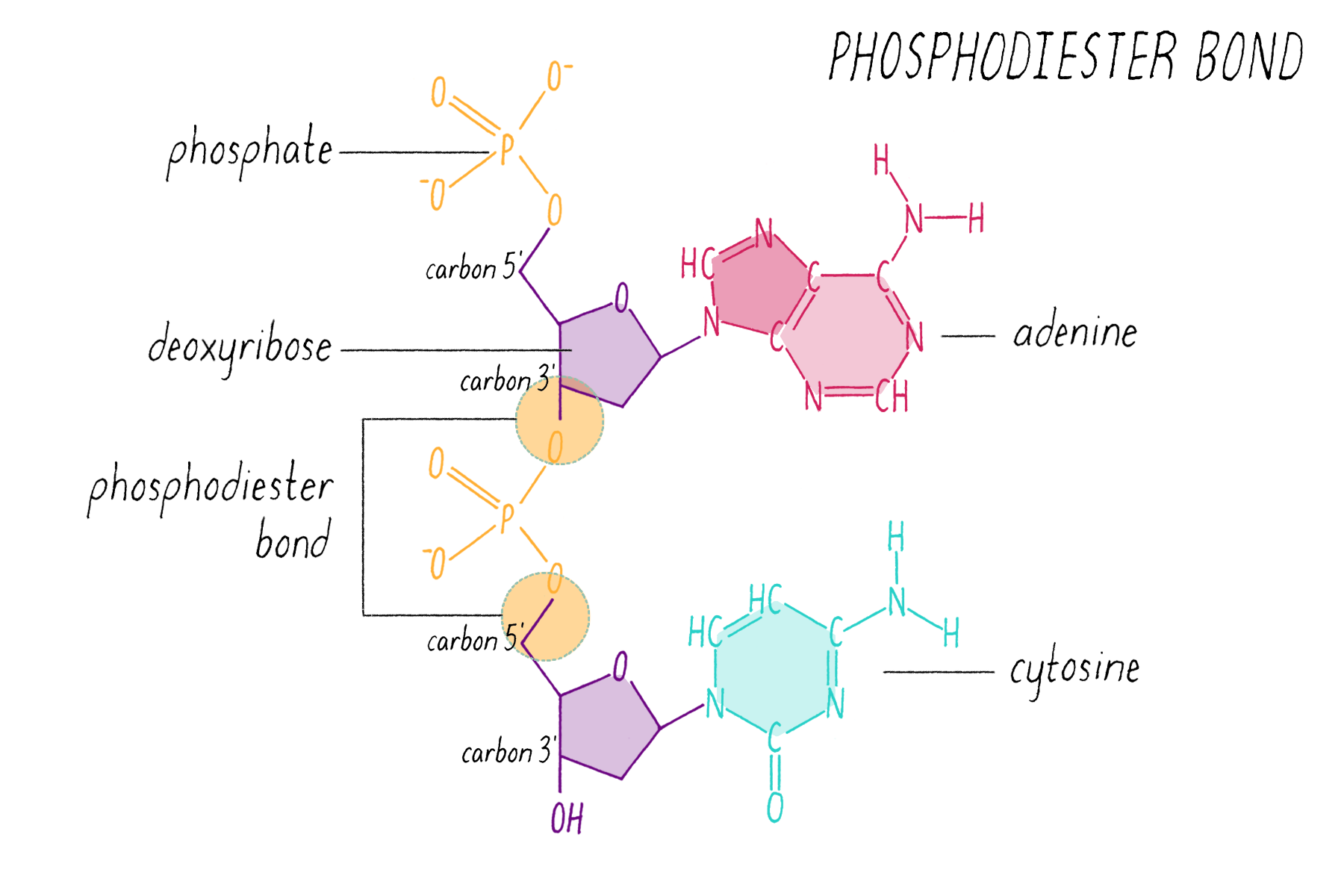
The bond that joins nucleotides together to form a strand of DNA or RNA. This covalent bond is formed between a phosphate and the 3’ carbon of one sugar (ribose or deoxyribose) and the 5’ carbon of the next sugar.

Diagram of phosphodiester bonds (PO^{3−}_{4}) between three nucleotides. The 5' end has a 5' carbon attached to a phosphate, and the other end, the 3' end, has a 3' carbon attached to a hydroxyl group.

In chemistry, a phosphodiester bond occurs when exactly two of the hydroxyl groups (−OH) in phosphoric acid react with hydrox groups on other molecules to form two ester bonds. The "bond" involves this linkage C−O−PO^{−}_{2}O−C. Discussion of phosphodiesters is dominated by their prevalence in DNA and RNA, but phosphodiesters occur in other biomolecules, e.g. acyl carrier proteins, phospholipids and the cyclic forms of GMP and AMP (cGMP and cAMP).

== Phosphodiester Backbone of DNA and RNA ==
Phosphodiester bonds make up the backbones of DNA and RNA. In the phosphodiester bonds of nucleic acids, a phosphate is attached to the 5' carbon of one nucleoside and to the 3' carbon of the adjacent nucleoside. Specifically, it is the phosphodiester bonds that link the 3' carbon atom of one sugar molecule and the 5' carbon atom of another (hence the name 3', 5' phosphodiester linkage used with reference to this kind of bond in DNA and RNA chains). The involved saccharide groups are deoxyribose in DNA and ribose in RNA. In order for the phosphodiester bond to form, joining the nucleosides, the tri-phosphate or di-phosphate forms of the nucleotide building blocks are broken apart to give off energy required to drive the enzyme-catalyzed reaction. In DNA replication, for example, formation of the phosphodiester bonds is catalyzed by a DNA polymerase enzyme, using a pair of magnesium cations and other supporting structures. Formation of the bond occurs not only in DNA and RNA replication, but also in the repair and recombination of nucleic acids, and may require the involvement of various polymerases, primers, and/or ligases. During the replication of DNA, for example, the DNA polymerase I leaves behind a hole between the phosphates in the newly formed backbone. DNA ligase is able to form a phosphodiester bond between the nucleotides on each side of the gap.

Phosphodiesters are negatively charged at pH 7. The negative charge attracts histones, metal cations such as magnesium, and polyamines [needs citation]. Repulsion between these negative charges influences the conformation of the polynucleic acids.

== Breaking the Phosphodiester Bond ==
Hydrolysis (breaking) of phosphodiester bonds can be promoted in several ways. Phosphodiesterases are enzymes that catalyze the hydrolysis of the phosphodiester bond. These enzymes are involved in repairing DNA and RNA sequences, nucleotide salvage, and in the conversion of cGMP and cAMP to GMP and AMP, respectively. Hydrolysis of the phosphodiester bond also occurs chemically and spontaneously, without the aid of enzymes. For example, simple ribose (in RNA) has one more hydroxyl group than deoxyribose (in DNA), making the former less stable and more susceptible to alkaline hydrolysis, wherein relatively high pH conditions induce the breaking of the phosphodiester linkage between two ribonucleotides. The relative instability of RNA under hydroxyl attack of its phosphodiester bonds makes it inadequate for the storage of genomic information, but contributes to its usefulness in transcription and translation.

== See also ==
- Phosphodiesterase
- Phosphodiesterase inhibitor
- DNA replication, DNA, ATP
- Teichoic acid, DNase I
- PDE5
- Nick (DNA)
