= RNA-targeting small molecule drugs =

Class of drugs

RNA-targeting small molecules represent a class of small molecules, organic compounds with traditional drug properties (e.g., Lipinski's rule of five) that can bind to RNA secondary or tertiary structures and alter translation patterns, localization, and degradation.

== Origins ==
Recent discoveries implicating RNA in the pathogenesis of several forms of cancer and neuromuscular diseases have created a paradigm shift in drug discovery. This work combined with larger accessible chemical space, advances in high-throughput screening capabilities and structural characterization techniques such as NMR spectroscopy, X-ray crystallography, Cryogenic electron microscopy together with computational modeling, has pushed forward the realization that RNA is a dynamic yet viable drug target. Traditionally, RNA was thought to be a mediator between DNA sequence-encoded instructions and functional protein. However, recent reports have shown that there are a large number of non-coding RNAs (ncRNAs) that are not translated into protein. Whereas 85% of the human genome is transcribed into RNA only 3% of the transcripts code for functional protein. Although, ncRNAs do affect gene expression levels by a variety of mechanisms. Further, RNA can adopt discrete secondary or tertiary structures which play a pivotal role in many biological processes and disease pathology. For these reasons, RNA is being recognized as an attractive drug target for small molecules.

The earliest attempts to target RNA led to the discovery that aminoglycosides could bind to human RNA. In an early report, Noller discovered that several classes of antibiotics (streptomycin, tetracycline, spectinomycin, edeine, hygromycin, and the neomycins) could "protect" nucleotides in 16S ribosomal RNA by binding to this RNA. Subsequent studies by Schroeder and Green began to plant the seed that RNA could be targeted. Schroeder uncovered that aminoglycosides could inhibit protein synthesis by interacting with the ribosome through interactions with the 3' end of the 16S RNA of E. coli taking advantage of RNA conformational changes. Green and coworkers further confirmed this idea, discovering that aminoglycosides blocked the interaction of HIV-1 Rev protein and its viral RNA-binding site.

David Wilson and David Draper were the first to suggest that RNA structures could be targeted by small molecules. They hypothesized that RNA could be "druggable" by targeting the 3D structure in the same way as protein 3D structures are used as drug targets and furthered the idea that targeting RNA could be used to treat diseases. Czarnik and co-workers at Parke-Davis completed a screen on HIV Tat. They found multiple small molecule inhibitors of the HIV-1 Tat—TAR system that recognized the bulge, lower stem, or loop region of the TAR RNA. One of the compounds discovered, 2,4,5,6-tetraaminoquinozaline, binds to the loop region of TAR, downregulates cellular Tat transactivation, and ultimately inhibits HIV-1 replication.

The use of aminoglycosides, while an early start to RNA-targeting, came with some challenges. These molecules were only modestly selective and showed unfavorable toxicity levels at relevant therapeutic concentrations. As another strategy for targeting RNA, antisense oligonucleotides were developed which have been pushed forward through the clinic for several diseases. By this principle, if one can identify an RNA involved in disease then the sequence can be used to design a complementary antisense oligonucleotide, and that agent can be introduced into cells to treat the disease. But, this approach in its basic form has been met with several challenges. The most obvious are their large size and propensity to degradation by nucleases. In order for cellular RNA to be effective it must enter the cells intact. While backbone modifications to antisense oligonucleotides in order to prevent nuclease degradation have been shown to work, this approach is still somewhat limited. Small molecules may present a better way to target RNA and subsequently DNA because they can be designed to be more "drug-like" and have a better chance of reaching their target, most by oral administration. For this reason, there is an emerging interest in designing and discovering small molecules to target RNA secondary and tertiary structures to ultimately treat new diseases.

== Human treatment ==
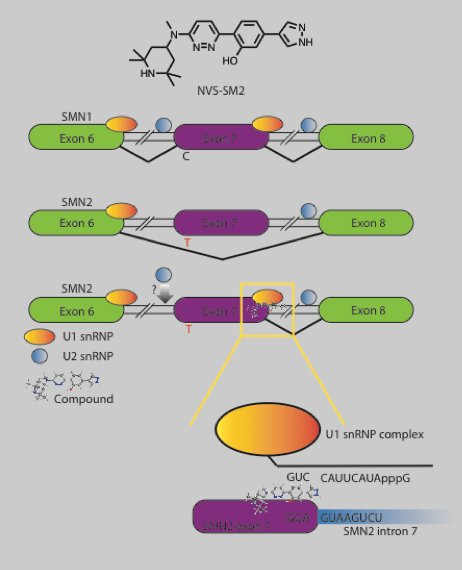
Branaplam Proposed Mechanism of Action. Branaplam acts to promote exon 7 inclusion in SMA patients by enhancing splicing at the exon 7-exon 8 junction. The small molecule (NVS-SM2) enhances recognition of SMN2 transcripts by U1-U2 specifically by enhancing the affinity of U1 to the 5'-splice site of SMN exon 7.

There are limited examples of small molecules that target RNA and are approved drugs for the treatment of human disease. Ribavirin was approved in 2002 to treat Hepatitis C and viral hemorrhagic fever. As a nucleoside inhibitor, the guanosine analog prodrug is used to stop viral RNA synthesis and viral mRNA capping by incorporating into RNA and pairing to uracil or cytosine. Branaplam is currently in phase I/II clinical trial for the treatment of Spinal Muscular Atrophy (SMA). This molecule is from a class of pyridazine small molecules and enhances the inclusion of exon 7, resulting in a full-length and functional protein product.

Branaplam represents the first mechanistic study of splicing modulation using a sequence-selective small molecule. The drug stabilizes the transient double-stranded RNA (dsRNA) structure formed between the SMN2 pre-mRNA and U1 snRNP complex, a key component of the splicesome. Further, this compound acts by increasing the binding affinity of U1 snRNP to the 5' splice site (5'ss) in a sequence-selective manner that is discrete from constitutive recognition. Ataluren is in clinical trials for the treatment of Duchenne Muscular Dystrophy (DMD). It is believed that Ataluren acts by promoting insertion of near-cognate tRNAs at the site of the nonsense codon without affecting transcription, mRNA processing, mRNA stability, or protein stability to give nonsense suppression. This drug would be effective for ~10% of patients with DMD who have a single mutation in the DMD gene causing a stop codon to appear prematurely (nonsense mutation).

== Animal treatment ==
Compared to the number of drug candidates that have successfully made it to the clinical trial phase, there are many more lead compounds which have been tested in vivo using various animal models. Much of the current work that has progressed to in vivo testing has been directed to the RNA repeat expansions implicated in genetic neuromuscular diseases. In myotonic dystrophy type 1 (DM1), r(CUG)exp mRNAs sequester proteins including the alternative splicing regulator MBNL1 into the nucleus causing missplicing. Several groups have developed compounds which bind the toxic RNA and dissolve nuclear foci. In 2011, Artero and coworkers discovered that a peptide could reduce the toxicity associated with r(CUG) repeats in Drosophila and mouse models. Disney and colleagues provided the first small molecules that targeted r(CUG) repeats in animals models by using rational designing to identify many small molecules directly targeting this toxic RNA and the compounds improved disease defects in a DM1 mouse model.

Other works by the Disney group has shown that in cellular models of various RNA-mediated diseases that are causes by RNA repeats such as r(CAG) in Huntington's disease and r(CCUG) repeats in Myotonic Dystrophy Types 2 could also be targeted with small molecules. Nakamori and colleagues also reported in 2012 that erythromycin could be orally dosed in DM1 mouse models to restore missplicing defects and inhibit the complex formed between r(CUG) and MBNL1. In that same year, Miller and coworkers screened a library of compounds to find a small molecule drug that could improve splicing defects in a mouse model. The Zimmerman group has taken a rational design approach to discovering small molecule drugs that target r(CUG). One such compound contains a selective triaminotriazine recognition motif which binds to the UU mismatches in r(CUG) selectively most likely in a base triplet combined with an amidinium RNA groove binding unit. Studies using a Drosophila model for DM1 showed an influence on related phenotypic outcomes such as eye morphology and climbing distance.

Aside from studies involved r(CUG) repeats, other complex RNA structures have also been targeted. Pearson and coworkers discovered that a cationic porphyrin (TMPyP4) bound a G-quadruplex r(G_{4}C_{2}) and inhibited the binding of proteins to r(G_{4}C_{2}). Work by Disney and Petrucelli rationally identified small molecules that can target this repeat and affect disease biology in model cellular systems and also in patient-derive iNeurons. Further studies by Rothstein and colleagues determined that TMPyP4 could suppress r(G_{4}C_{2})-mediated neurodegeneration in a Drosophila model. Additionally targets have been rationally identified by using a powerful seqecune-based design approach termed informal to identify dozens of bioactive small molecules that target disease causing non-coding RNA termed INFORNA. This study important showed for the first time that small molecules appear to have selectivities that are competitive with oligonucleotides with cell-permeable and medicinally optimizable small molecules. Additionally, compounds have been shown to be bioactive in diverse disease settings that ranged from breast cancer. and hepatocellular carcinoma. More recently, the Disney group further used their prediction database INFORNA to design Targaprimir-96 to target miRNA precursors in animal models of cancer, the first small molecules to do so. This compound has a nanomolar affinity for the miRNA hairpin precursor selectively over other sequences. Targaprimir-96 was further tested in cells and in mice, inhibiting tumor growth in a xenograft mouse model of triple negative breast cancer upon i.p. injection.

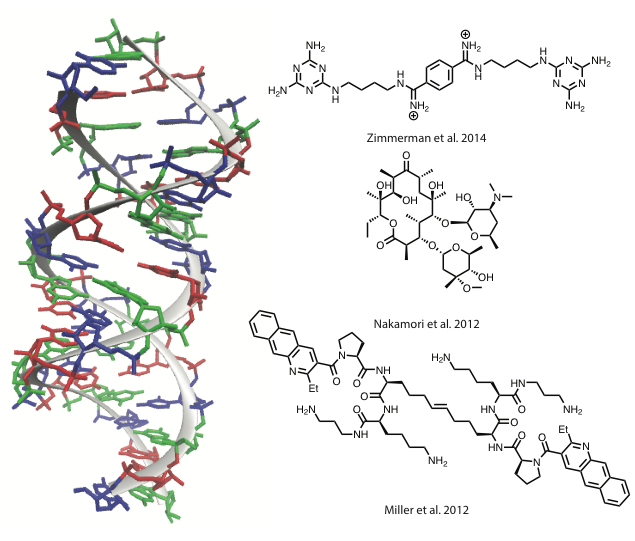
Small Molecule Drugs for the Treatment of Myotonic Dystrophy Type 1 (DM1). Lead compounds for the treatment of Myotonic Dystrophy Type 1 (DM1) that recognize r(CUG)exp repeats in animal models and effect phenotypic outcomes consistent with the disease. PDB: 3GM7

== Cellular use ==
RNA-targeting small molecule drug discovery has greatly benefitted from the available cellular models for disease. The use of cell culture in early development has become a requirement for assessing the basic efficacy of a drug candidate. Thus, more research groups have implemented these techniques in their programs. In a leading example, Al-Hashimi and coworkers identified six small molecules with high affinity for TAR of HIV-1 through a computational approach. They docked a library of small molecules onto RNA dynamic structures generated by NMR and Molecular Dynamics (MD) simulations. The hit molecules inhibited the Tat—TAR interaction in vitro. They arrived at lead molecule, netilmicin, that had the best selectivity for HIV-1 TAR and inhibited HIV-1 replication in cells with a low IC50. The Disney group has studied aminoglycoside derivatives in 2009 for their ability to inhibit interactions between repeat RNA and proteins. Using their prediction database INFORNA, they discovered that a compound could bind to 1 x 1 UU internal loops on an N-methyl peptide backbone. They confirmed that like other compounds that target DM1 r(CUG), they could inhibit the complex between r(CUG)-MBNL1, disrupt nuclear foci, and increase nucleocytoplasmic transport of the gene in patient-derived DM1 fibroblasts. In that study the Disney group also described several approaches to validate the RNA targets of small molecules. In the first approach termed chemical cross-linking and isolation by pull down (Chem-CLIP) and chemical cross-linking and isolation by pull down to map binding sites (Chem-CLIP-Map).

These studies showed in cells that small molecules can direct target disease-causing r(CUG) repeats in DM1 and that impressively the compound can discriminate against other RNAs with shorter repeats and also between the mutant and wild type allele of the DMPK mRNA that contains r(CUG) disease-causing repeats. In an additional approach, dubbed small–molecule nucleic acid profiling by cleavage applied to RNA (Ribo-SNAP) showed that small molecules can be used to cleave RNA targets in cells and also importantly demonstrated that designer small molecules target precisely disease causing RNA repeats and discriminate against RNAs that are not disease causing but have short repeats of r(CUG). Thus, targeting RNA structure with small molecules can have important selectively discrimination implications in cells.

In 2014, Chenowith and colleagues reported a cationic triptycene scaffold that targets RNA and DNA three-way junctions. Subsequent studies showed that these molecules exhibited favorable cellular uptake and cytotoxicity in human ovarian cancer cell lines. In 2017, the Xodo group reported anthrafurandione and anthrathiophenedione small molecules with aminoethyl side chains could bind to RNA G-quadraplexes at the 5'-UTR of certain mRNAs. Further, these compounds were shown to suppress the KRAS oncogene in pancreatic cancer cells and induce apoptosis by reducing the metabolic activity of the cells.

== In vitro ==
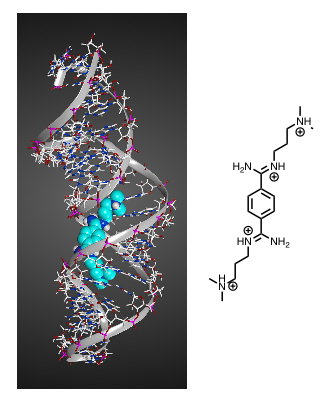
NMR Structure of HIV-1 RNA frameshift site stem-loop bound to DB213, an inhibitor of viral replication. PDB: 2L94.

In 2009, the Zimmerman group discovered a compound to target the trinucleotide repeat expanded RNA and DNA that cause DM1. Through rational design, they utilized a triaminotriazine recognition unit to target TT or UU mismatches through a Janus Wedge type binding mode, creating a base triplet with the mismatch. The combined use of an acridine intercalator to pi-pi stack on the target gave a nanomolar binding affinity for TT or UU mismatches over others. Along with high binding affinity, this molecule was shown to displace MBNL from the complex with r(CUG) with a micromolar K_{i.} Additionally, HIV-1 RNA has been targeted extensively in vitro by RNA-binding small molecules. In 2007, Miller and coworkers used dynamic combinatorial chemistry to screen a compound library against HIV-1 frameshift regulatory stem-loop RNA. They identified a hit compound that was selective for the regulatory sequence with micromolar binding affinity.

In 2011, Butcher and colleagues discovered a frameshifting stimulator (DB213) which bound to HIV-1 FS RNA with moderate binding affinity. An NMR structure of the RNA in complex with DB213, showed that the small molecule bound to the major groove of the RNA duplex. Schneekloth and Hargrove have taken a different approach by targeting the HIV-1 TAR RNA hairpin. In a small molecule microarray screening, the Schneekloth group identified a thienopyridine derivative that interacts with HIV-1 TAR RNA hairpin. Further SAR studies provided more information on the structure and binding mode. The lead analogue was found to bind to the 5'-UTR of HIV with an IC_{50} of 40 μM for displacing a Tat-derived peptide. The Hargrove group developed a small library of amiloride derivatives with changes at the C(5) and C(6) positions to improve the binding affinity of amiloride to the loop and bulge of the HIV-1 TAR RNA. Using in vitro studies and modeling, they found a hit compound whose inhibition activity was increased by more than 100x compared to the parent amiloride. This compound is reported to be one of the tightest non-aminoglycoside TAR ligands reported to date.
