= Betty Q. Banker =

Pediatric neuropathologist

- Born: 6 March 1921; New York City, New York
- Died: 7 February 2010 (aged 89)
- Education: Albany Medical College
- Awards: 1966 Weil Award for Best Paper on Experimental Neuropathology Presented at the Annual Meeting of the American Association of Neuropathology; 1983 Child Neurology Society Hower Award; 1986 Book Award of the American Medical Writers Association; 2011 MetroHealth Medical Hall of Honor
- Scientific career
- Fields: child neurology; neuropathology

Elizabeth Quarrier Banker (6 March 1921 – 7 February 2010) was a neurologist and neuropathologist known for her work in pediatric neuropathology. In 1983, she became the first woman to win the Hower Award of the Child Neurology Society.

== Early life ==
She was born in New York City and was raised on Long Island. After graduating from Ithaca College she became a high school teacher for a few years before attending Albany Medical College.

== Medical training ==
Banker did her neurology residency at Boston City Hospital under Derek Denny-Brown (1901–1981), with whom she wrote the paper “Amorphosynthesis from Left Parietal Lesion” published in 1954.

In 1953, she became a neuropathology resident at Massachusetts General Hospital. With neuropathologist Raymond Delacy Adams (1911–2008) and neurologist Maurice Victor (1920–2001), she published papers on muscular dystrophy and multiple myeloma.

== Seminal work in neuropathology ==
Spinal muscular atrophy, first described by Johann Hoffmann and Guido Werdnig in the early 1890s, was described both clinically and pathologically by Banker and Randolph Byers. They presented their work at the annual meeting of the American Neurological Association in 1960 and published in 1961. According to Banker's obituary, the 1961 article “masterfully described the pathology and clinical features of the disease, showed that the outcome varied directly with age at onset, and correctly predicted that the infantile and childhood forms of spinal muscular atrophy and of adult-onset proximal muscle atrophy were facets of the same disease.”

In 1986, Banker coauthored a 2-volume textbook with Andrew Engel, titled Myology: Basic and Clinical,, which won the 1986 Book Award of the American Medical Writers Association.

She was active in the Muscular Dystrophy Association of America and held many roles, including Vice President and member of the Scientific Advisory Committee. In 1990, the association named a research fellowship in her honor.

While she specialized in the neuropathology of pediatric neuromuscular disease, including Duchenne muscular dystrophy and arthrogryposis, she also published on intracranial infections, dermatomyositis, leukodystrophy, neonatal hypoxia and central pontine myelinolysis.

== Personal life ==
In 1956, she married neurologist Maurice Victor, best known for coauthoring the textbook Adams and Victor's Principles of Neurology with Raymond Delacy Adams, first published by McGraw in 1977. They had one son.

She is remembered as a “teacher of infinite patience,” but “demanding to the point of perfection.”

== Honors and awards ==
- 1966: Weil Award for Best Paper on Experimental Neuropathology Presented at the Annual Meeting of the American Association of Neuropathology
- 1983: Child Neurology Society Hower Award
- 1986: Book Award of the American Medical Writers Association
- 1990: Muscular Dystrophy Association names "Betty Q. Banker Research Fellowship" in her honor
- 2011: MetroHealth Medical Hall of Honor

== Selected works ==
- DENNY-BROWN D, BANKER BQ. Amorphosynthesis from left parietal lesion. AMA Arch Neurol Psychiatry. 1954;71(3):302-313. doi:10.1001/archneurpsyc.1954.02320390032003
- Banker BQ. A phase and electron microscopic study of dystrophic muscle. II. The pathological changes in the newborn Bar Harbor 129 dystrophic mouse. J Neuropathol Exp Neurol. 1968 Apr;27(2):183-209. doi: 10.1097/00005072-196804000-00002. PMID 4869022.
- Banker BQ, Girvin JP. The ultrastructural features of the mammalian muscle spindle. J Neuropathol Exp Neurol. 1971 Apr;30(2):155-95. doi: 10.1097/00005072-197104000-00001. PMID 4260063.
- Myology: Basic and Clinical (with Andrew Engel)
