= Ravindra N. Singh =

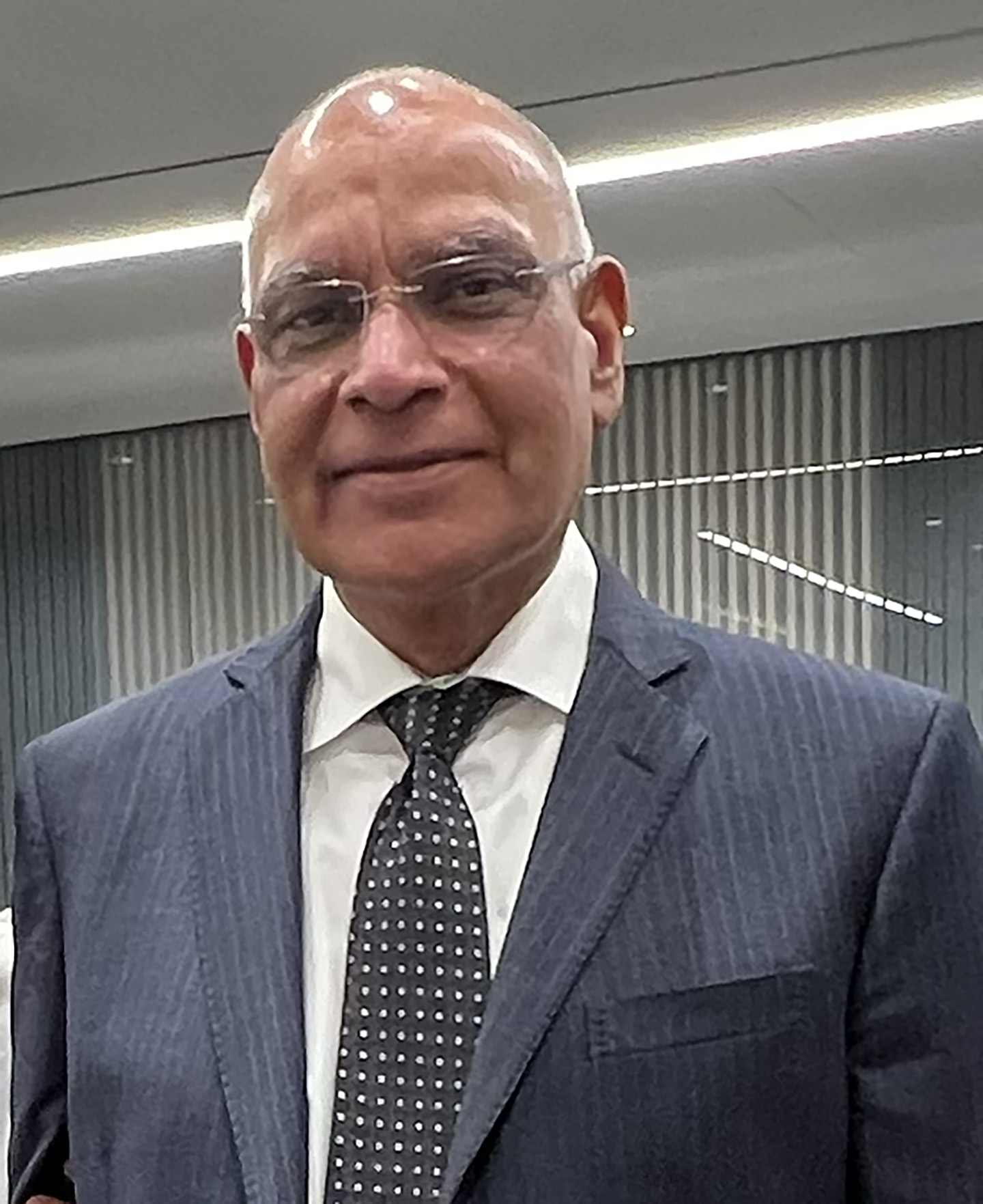
- Born: March 31, 1963 (age 63)
- Occupations: Scientist, inventor and academic
- Awards: Presidential Early Career Award for Scientists and Engineers, U.S. Federal Government (2006)

Academic background
- Education: BSc., Chemistry; MSc., Biochemistry; PhD., Biochemistry
- Alma mater: Banaras Hindu University; Russian Academy of Sciences

Academic work
- Institutions: Iowa State University

Ravindra N. Singh is an Indian American scientist, inventor and academic. He is a professor in the Department of Biomedical Sciences of the College of Veterinary Medicine at Iowa State University.

Singh is most known for researching RNA biology and molecular genetics; particularly for the invention of the Intron Splicing Silencer N1 (ISS-N1) target that led to the first FDA-approved drug (Spinraza/Nusinersen) for the treatment of spinal muscular atrophy (SMA). He is the recipient of several awards, including the Salsbury Endowment at Iowa State University and the 2006 Presidential Early Career Award for Scientists and Engineers (PECASE).

== Education ==
Singh earned a B.Sc. in Chemistry in 1983 and an M.Sc. in Biochemistry in 1985, both from Banaras Hindu University. He received a Ph.D. in biochemistry from the Institute of Biochemistry and Physiology of Microorganisms at the Russian Academy of Sciences in 1993.

== Career ==
Singh began his academic career as a Postdoctoral Research Associate, holding an appointment initially at the University of Texas MD Anderson Cancer Center, then at Oregon State University, and later at the University of Texas at Austin. In 2001, he became a Special and Scientific Staff and Research Assistant Professor at the New England Medical Center and Tufts University School of Medicine, followed by an appointment as assistant professor in the Department of Medicine at the University of Massachusetts, where he worked on the development of the ISS-N1 until 2007. He joined Iowa State University as an associate professor in 2007 and was named the Salsbury Endowed Chair in Veterinary Medicine from 2008 to 2016. Since 2012, he has been serving as a professor in the Department of Biomedical Sciences of the College of Veterinary Medicine at Iowa State University, where he leads the Singh research group. He is also affiliated with the Roy J. Carver Department of Biochemistry, Biophysics and Molecular Biology at Iowa State University, where he served as the member of the Biotechnology Council and Graduate Council.

== Research ==
As an independent investigator, Singh has contributed to the field of molecular biology by studying the mechanism of alternative splicing, particularly in the context of spinal muscular atrophy (SMA), and developing targeted therapies, including antisense drugs, for correcting aberrant splicing associated with genetic diseases. His early research focused on purification and characterization of enzymes, including cellulases, transglutaminases, and RNA replicase from Turnip Yellow Mosaic Virus. Working in the laboratory of Alan Lambowitz, he also analyzed how the maturase LtrA binds to the Ll.LtrB Group II intron in Lactococcus lactis, facilitating cDNA synthesis and shedding light on its role in RNA splicing and its evolutionary origins.

Singh delved into the functions of the Survival Motor Neuron (SMN) protein in RNA metabolism, linking its roles to SMA and various other conditions. Collaborating with Nirmal K. Singh, Natalia N. Singh and Elliot J. Androphy, he investigated the function of the intronic splicing silencer N1 (ISS-N1) in the SMN2 gene, its involvement in exon 7 skipping and its therapeutic potential for SMA, leading to the first medical therapy for the condition and earning patents. He also established that an 8-mer antisense oligonucleotide (ASO) corrects SMN2 exon 7 splicing aberrations in SMA models, increasing SMN levels with specificity and efficacy. Furthermore, he examined the C6U mutation, and exonic splicing enhancers in exon 7 of the SMN gene, shedding light on the regulation of splicing in SMA.

Singh explored how RNA structure, specifically terminal stem loop 2 (TSL2), influences exon 7 splicing in the SMN genes, and identified TIA1 and TIAR proteins as positive regulators of SMN2 exon 7 splicing, revealing insights into SMA pathology. He developed a multi-exon skipping detection assay (MESDA) to capture multiple splice isoforms of SMN genes in a single experiment. He uncovered therapeutic significance of an RNA structure formed by a long-distance interaction within an intron, and demonstrated how a small ASO (8-mer ASO) could be used for therapeutic splicing correction in SMA. His research also revealed an association of male infertility with the low SMN levels in a mild mouse model of SMA, and showed how activation of a cryptic splice site could be exploited for the treatment of rare cases of SMA. In addition, he showcased novel sequence and structural motifs associated with RNA-SMN interactions, and discovered a huge repertoire of circular RNAs (circRNAs) generated by human SMN genes. In a paper published in Scientific Reports, he showed aberrant transcription of genes on chromosomes 4, 7, 10 and X upon overexpression of a circRNA encompassing four early exons of SMN genes. His research identified and characterized off-target effects of splicing modulating therapeutic compounds, including ASOs and small molecules, with his laboratory being the first to construct the super minigene to examine the effect of genetic mutations on transcription, splicing and translation.

== Awards and honors ==
- 2006 – Presidential Early Career Award for Scientists and Engineers (PECASE), U.S. Federal Government
- 2014-2016 – Elected Member, Graduate Council, Iowa State University
- 2014-2017 – Member, Biotechnology Council, Iowa State University

== Selected articles ==
- Singh, R. N., & Akimenko, V. K. (1993). Isolation of a cellobiohydrolase of Clostridium thermocellum capable of degrading natural crystalline substrates. Biochemical and biophysical research communications, 192(3), 1123–1130.
- Singh, R. N., & Mehta, K. (1994). Purification and characterization of a novel transglutaminase from filarial nematode Brugia malayi. European journal of biochemistry, 225(2), 625–634.
- Singh, R. N., & Dreher, T. W. (1997). Turnip Yellow Mosaic Virus RNA-Dependent RNA Polymerase: Initiation of Minus Strand Synthesisin Vitro. Virology, 233(2), 430–439.
- Singh, R. N., & Dreher, T. W. (1998). Specific site selection in RNA resulting from a combination of nonspecific secondary structure and-CCR-boxes: initiation of minus strand synthesis by turnip yellow mosaic virus RNA-dependent RNA polymerase. Rna, 4(9), 1083–1095.
- Wank, H., SanFilippo, J., Singh, R. N., Matsuura, M., & Lambowitz, A. M. (1999). A reverse transcriptase/maturase promotes splicing by binding at its own coding segment in a group II intron RNA. Molecular cell, 4(2), 239–250.
- Singh, R. N., Saldanha, R. J., D'Souza, L. M., & Lambowitz, A. M. (2002). Binding of a group II intron-encoded reverse transcriptase/maturase to its high affinity intron RNA binding site involves sequence-specific recognition and autoregulates translation. Journal of molecular biology, 318(2), 287–303.
- Singh, N. N., Androphy, E. J., & Singh, R. N. (2004). An extended inhibitory context causes skipping of exon 7 of SMN2 in spinal muscular atrophy. Biochemical and biophysical research communications, 315(2), 381–388.
- Singh, N. N., Androphy, E. J., & Singh, R. N. (2004). In vivo selection reveals combinatorial controls that define a critical exon in the spinal muscular atrophy genes. Rna, 10(8), 1291–1305.
- Singh, N. K., Singh, N. N., Androphy, E. J., & Singh, R. N. (2006). Splicing of a critical exon of human Survival Motor Neuron is regulated by a unique silencer element located in the last intron. Molecular and cellular biology, 26(4), 1333–1346.
- Luo, D., Ottesen, E. W., Lee, J. H., & Singh, R. N. (2024). Transcriptome-and proteome-wide effects of a circular RNA encompassing four early exons of the spinal muscular atrophy genes. Scientific Reports, 14(1), 10442.
