= Spliceman =

Online tool that predicts genetic mutations

Spliceman is an online genomic identification tool used to predict the likelihood that a mutation within a DNA sequence is linked with genetic disease. It was created in 2011 by a Brown University lab, and has been used in several studies to identify disease-causing mutant alleles.

== Context ==
Numerous sources cite that approximately one-third of disease-causing mutations affect RNA splicing. Such mutations frequently affect Exonic splicing enhancers, regions of pre-mRNA that recruit the spliceosome to remove intron sequences and aid in the formation mature mRNA. Spliceman Co-Authors Kian Huat Lim and William Fairbrother write that "Spliceman takes a set of DNA sequences with point mutations and computes how likely these single nucleotide variants alter splicing phenotypes."

The tool takes advantage of findings in 2011 on positional distribution analysis within DNA sequences. Each hexamer of DNA base pairs has a positional distribution near splice sites where it is most likely to occur. Point mutations that change one hexamer to another with large changes in positional distributions were shown to be more likely to cause splicing mutations than mutations with small changes to positional distributions.

Spliceman was created to apply those findings by predicting the likelihood of splicing mutations based on the distances in positional distributions between RNA sequences. Users enter a DNA sequence as input to the program with an indicated mutation. Spliceman isolates the changed hexamers and computes the L1-distance between the frequencies of each hexamer appearing at each location near the splice site to measure the differences in their positional distributions. They distances are then assigned percentile ranks to estimate the likelihood of a splicing mutation.

== Applications ==
The Spliceman tool has applications in personalized genomic medicine. It has been used in several studies to identify disease-causing mutant alleles. Its applications so far include aid in the location of mutations related to neural tube defects, pustular psoriasis, chronic ear infection, hypercholesterolemia, and several other genetic illnesses.

The Spliceman tool is available for free online on the website for the Fairbrother Lab.

A second version of the tool, Spliceman 2.0, has been developed to accept inputs in a wider array of file formats. This makes the tool more compatible with other tools that handle variants. It can handle many more variations than its precursor due to its ability to accept files of larger sizes. Spliceman 2.0 outputs a report that includes more data and visualization of those data.
