= Amanda E. Hargrove =

American chemist

Amanda E. Hargrove is a chemist and professor at the University of Toronto Mississauga (UTM). She is also the editor-in-chief of Medicinal Research Reviews, and a member of the Scientific Advisory Board of Arrakis Therapeutics. Prior to joining UTM, Hargrove directed an interdisciplinary research program in chemical biology at Duke University that focused on harnessing the specific interactions between small molecules and RNA, and using those RNA-small molecule interactions to probe the structure, and function of RNA. The long-term goal of the group's research was to identify specific molecule-RNA interactions that may have therapeutic potential in the treatment of viral infection and human disease. She has received numerous awards for her scientific research, teaching, and service in support of diversity, equity, and inclusion.

== Academic career ==
Hargrove attended Trinity University in San Antonio, Texas and received her B.S. in Chemistry and Spanish in 2004. As an undergraduate student, she conducted research with John D. Spence on the synthesis and Bergman cyclization of meso-tethered enediyne-porphyrins. Hargrove conducted her graduate work with Professors Eric V. Anslyn and Jonathan L. Sessler at the University of Texas, Austin, and earned her Ph.D. in 2010 for her thesis, Combining recognition motifs for improved sensing and biological activity of oligosaccharides and phosphorylated molecules. From 2010 to 2013 she was an NIH Postdoctoral Fellow in Chemistry at California Institute of Technology, where she worked in the lab of Peter B. Dervan and conducted research on DNA-binding polyamides as inhibitors of a prostate-specific response gene in prostate cancer. Her postdoctoral work also focused on optimizing conditions to increase solubility of pyrrole-imidazole polyamide DNA-binding molecules as a strategy to increase their biological activity (these are a class of potential DNA-targeting therapeutics). Hargrove became assistant professor in the department of chemistry at Duke University in Durham, NC in 2013 and earned promotion to associate professor with tenure in 2020. As of late 2023, Amanda joined the faculty of the University of Toronto with appointment to its Mississauga campus, officially having moved from Duke Univeristy in July of 2024. Amanda serves as a professor of Medicinal Chemistry in the Department of Chemical and Physical Sciences.

== Research ==
Hargrove's research program focuses on organic chemical synthesis and screening of small molecules that have specific interactions with different RNA structural motifs. The aim of the research is to identify small molecules that can target the specific RNA structures found in viruses. Hargrove's research program has identified RNA-binding molecules that can inhibit replication of Sars-CoV-2 virus and enterovirus (the virus that causes hand, foot, and mouth disease). The potential application of small molecules to treat various viral infections including enterovirus (Hand, Foot, and Mouth Disease) and SARS-CoV-2 has been discussed in popular media including the New York Times. Amanda was promoted to professor back in 2023. Amanda does critical research that has a main focus on small molecules to study the structure and function of RNA. She studies the way small chemical compounds interact with RNA to understand how it works. She develops new and different ways to treat viral infections and metastatic cancer as well. Her work is aimed to improve the understanding of biological processes and support development of new therapeutic strategies.

== Awards and honors ==
Hargrove has received numerous awards and honors:

- 2023 Elisa Izaurralde Award for Innovation, Teaching, and Service.
- 2022 Rising Star Award from the American Chemical Society Women Chemists Committee.
- 2021 Cram Lehn Pedersen Prize.
- 2020 Alfred P. Sloan Foundation Fellow.
- 2020 Duke University Dean's Diversity Award.
- 2018 National Science Foundation CAREER Award.
- 2017 Cottrell Scholar Award from Research Corporation for Science Advancement.
- 2015 Brent Nicklas-Prostate Cancer Foundation Young Investigator Award.
- 2014 Ralph E. Power Junior Faculty Enhancement Award.
