= Novartis Gene Therapies =

Biotechnology company

- Industry: Biotechnology
- Predecessor: AveXis
- Founded: 2012
- Products: Onasemnogene abeparvovec
- Owner: Novartis
- Parent: Novartis
- Website: www.novartis.com/about/innovative-medicines/novartis-pharmaceuticals/novartis-gene-therapies

Novartis Gene Therapies, until 2020 known as AveXis, is a biotechnology company that develops treatments for rare neurological genetic disorders. It was founded in Dallas, Texas, United States in 2012 by John Carbona after reorganizing a company called BioLife Cell Bank founded by David Genecov and John Harkey. Work done at Nationwide Children's Hospital in the laboratory of Brian Kaspar was licensed to AveXis in October 2013. Unusual for the time, Nationwide Children's Hospital, in addition to upfront and milestone payments, also took an equity position in AveXis. Kaspar became paid consultant pari passu with the license agreement in 2013. The company was built specifically around a discovery of a novel method of treating spinal muscular atrophy using gene therapy. AveXis was acquired by Novartis in 2018 for USD 8.7 billion.

In September 2020, Novartis changed the company's name to Novartis Gene Therapies.

In 2019, AveXis's first gene therapy drug onasemnogene abeparvovec (Zolgensma) received regulatory approval in the United States and, with a list price of USD 2.125 million per injection, became the most expensive drug in the world. In May 2020, the drug was conditionally approved in the European Union for the treatment of patients with spinal muscular atrophy (SMA) and a clinical diagnosis of SMA Type 1; or SMA patients with up to three copies of the SMN2 gene.

== Controversy ==
Shortly after the approval, the US Food and Drug Administration accused AveXis of data manipulation in their regulatory submission as well as in other regulatory submissions. After an investigation, it was alleged that Brian Kaspar and his brother Allan Kaspar, previously senior vice president of R&D, had ordered and then attempted to cover up data manipulation, the two were subsequently "exited" by the company
