= SRE =

SRE or Sre may refer to:

== Organizations ==
- Secretaría de Relaciones Exteriores (Secretariat of Foreign Affairs), the foreign ministry of Mexico
- Swinging Radio England, a former commercial pirate radio station
- Sempra Energy (New York Stock Exchange symbol), an American utility holding company
- Samenwerkingsverband Regio Eindhoven, the former name of the regional governmental agency for the city region of Eindhoven, Netherlands
- Sancta Romana Ecclesia ("The Holy Roman Church"), often used in reference to the College of Cardinals of the Roman Catholic Church
- Service de Renseignement de l’État Luxembourgish intelligence agency

== Science and technology ==
- Site reliability engineering, a discipline that incorporates aspects of software engineering and applies that to operations
- Space Capsule Recovery Experiment, an Indian satellite
- Sodium Reactor Experiment, a former US experimental nuclear power plant
- Software reverse engineering
- Simple regular expression, a deprecated IEEE POSIX standard about regular expressions

=== Biology and medicine ===
- Serious Reportable Event, an inexcusable outcome in a healthcare setting
- Splicing regulatory element, a pre-mRNA element which regulates splicing acting in cis
- Serotonin reuptake enhancer, a type of reuptake enhancer
- Serum response element, a DNA cis-regulatory element recognized by the serum response factor
- Steroid response element, a type of hormone response element
- Sterol regulatory element, a DNA cis-regulatory element recognized by sterol regulatory element-binding proteins

== Transportation ==
- Juana Azurduy de Padilla International Airport (IATA airport code), Sucre, Bolivia
- Saharanpur Junction railway station (Indian Railways code), India
- Si Rat Expressway, Thailand

== Other uses ==
- Seychellois rupee (SRe), the currency of the Seychelles
- Sex and Relationships Education, a form of sex education taught in the UK
- Sre, a dialect of the Koho language, a Bahnaric language spoken in Vietnam
