= MBNL1 =

Protein-coding gene in the species Homo sapiens

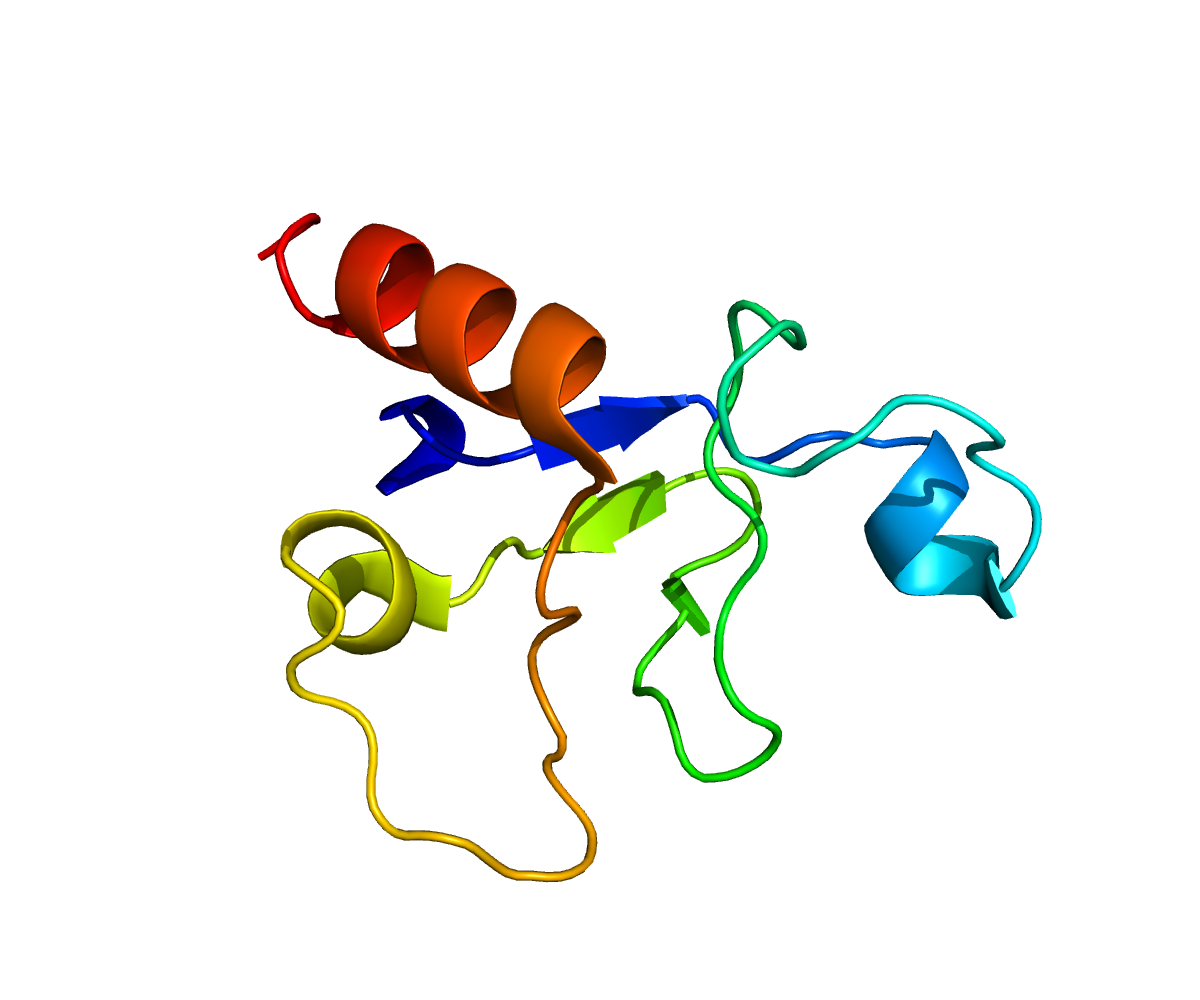

Identifiers
- Aliases: MBNL1, EXP, EXP35, EXP40, EXP42, MBNL, muscleblind like splicing regulator 1
- External IDs: OMIM: 606516; MGI: 1928482; GeneCards: MBNL1
Available structures
PDB	Ortholog search: PDBe RCSB
PDB	List of PDB id codes 3D2N, 3D2Q, 3D2S

Gene location (Human)
Chr.	Chromosome 3 (human)
Band	3q25.1-q25.2	Start	152,243,828 bp
Band	3q25.1-q25.2	End	152,465,780 bp

Gene location (Mouse)
Chr.	Chromosome 3 (mouse)
Band	3|3 D	Start	60,472,830 bp
Band	3|3 D	End	60,629,750 bp
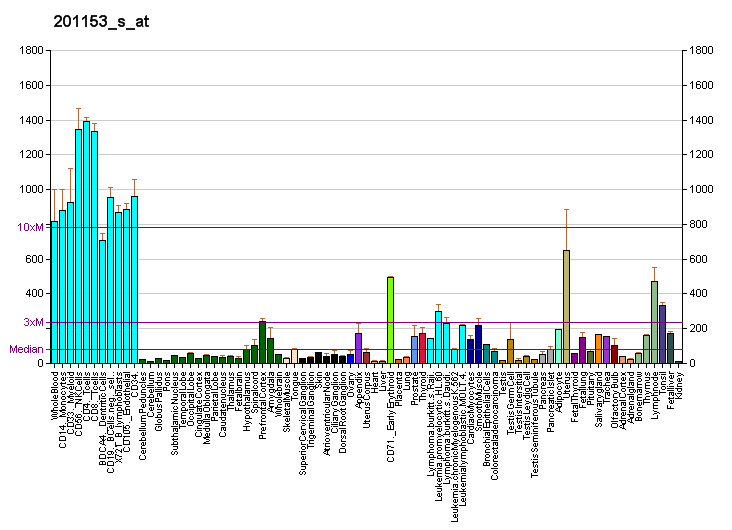

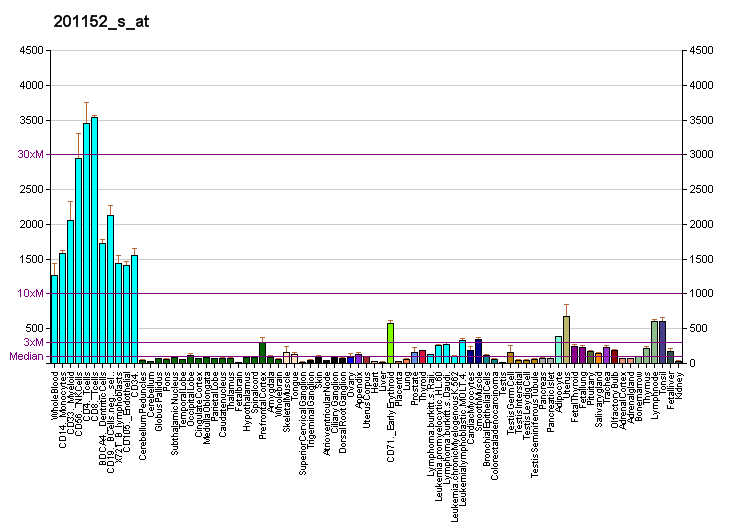

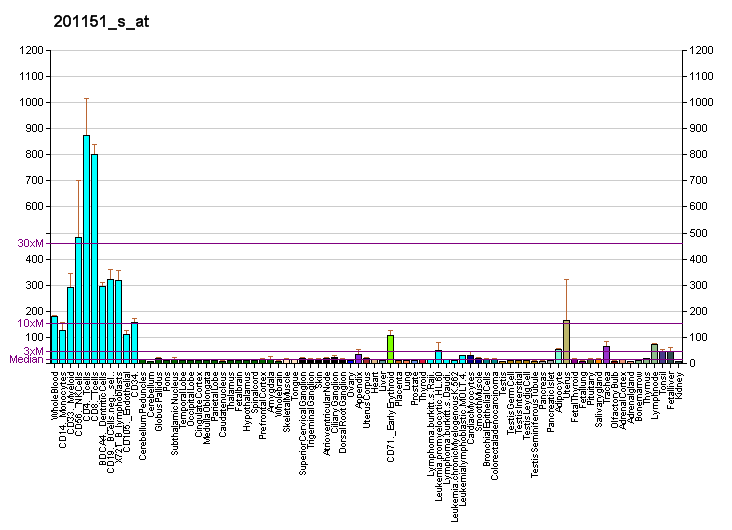
RNA expression pattern
Bgee	Human / Mouse (ortholog); Top expressed in: Achilles tendon; superficial temporal artery; saphenous vein; trabecular bone; tail of epididymis; lower lobe of lung; Skeletal muscle tissue of rectus abdominis; Skeletal muscle tissue of biceps brachii; urethra; skin of hip / Top expressed in: tunica media of zone of aorta; tibiofemoral joint; skin of external ear; triceps brachii muscle; stroma of bone marrow; ankle; intercostal muscle; body of femur; temporal muscle; sternocleidomastoid muscle; More reference expression data
BioGPS	More reference expression data
Gene ontology
Molecular function	regulatory region RNA binding; double-stranded RNA binding; protein binding; metal ion binding; RNA binding
Cellular component	cytoplasm; centrosome; cytoplasmic stress granule; nucleus; nucleoplasm; cytosol
Biological process	mRNA processing; regulation of RNA splicing; myoblast differentiation; in utero embryonic development; embryonic limb morphogenesis; RNA splicing; nervous system development; regulation of alternative mRNA splicing, via spliceosome
Sources:Amigo / QuickGO
Orthologs
Databases	NCBI: entry; OMA: entry
Species	Human	Mouse
Entrez	4154	56758
Ensembl	ENSG00000152601	ENSMUSG00000027763
UniProt	Q9NR56; Q86VM6	Q9JKP5
RefSeq (mRNA)	NM_001314057; NM_021038; NM_207292; NM_207293; NM_207294 NM_207295; NM_207296; NM_207297; NM_001363870	NM_001253708; NM_001253709; NM_001253710; NM_001253711; NM_001253713 NM_020007; NM_001310514
RefSeq (protein)	NP_001300986; NP_066368; NP_997175; NP_997176; NP_997177 NP_997178; NP_997179; NP_997180; NP_001350799; NP_001363747; NP_001363748; NP_001363749; NP_001363750; NP_001363751; NP_001363752; NP_001363753; NP_001363754; NP_001363755; NP_001363756; NP_001363757; NP_001363758; NP_001363759; NP_001363760; NP_001363761; NP_001363762; NP_001363763; NP_001363764; NP_001363765; NP_001363766; NP_001363767; NP_001363768; NP_001363769; NP_001363770; NP_001363771; NP_001363772; NP_001363773; NP_001363774; NP_001363775; NP_001363776; NP_001363777; NP_001363778; NP_001363780; NP_001363782; NP_001300986.1; NP_997178.1; NP_997179.1; NP_997180.1	NP_001240637; NP_001240638; NP_001240639; NP_001240640; NP_001240642 NP_001297443; NP_064391
Location (UCSC)	Chr 3: 152.24 – 152.47 Mb	Chr 3: 60.47 – 60.63 Mb
PubMed search
- Wikidata
View/Edit Human	View/Edit Mouse

Muscleblind Like Splicing Regulator 1 (MBNL1) is an RNA splicing protein that in humans is encoded by the MBNL1 gene. It has a well characterized role in Myotonic dystrophy where impaired splicing disrupts muscle development and function. In addition to regulating mRNA maturation of hundreds of genes MBNL1 (along with its paralogs MBNL2 & MBNL3) autoregulate alternative splicing of the MBNL1 pre-mRNA transcript. The founding member of the human MBNL family of proteins was the Drosophila Muscleblind protein (PMID 9334280).

Human MBNL1 is an alternative splicing regulator that harbors dual function as both a repressor and activator for terminal muscle differentiation. The repressive function of Human MBNL1 by sequestering at normal splice sites has been shown to lead to RNA-splicing defects that lead to muscular diseases. The gene can be alternatively spliced into multiple functionally distinct isoforms, some of which linked to be involved in cancer biology.

Human MBNL1 is a 370 amino acid protein composed of four Zinc Finger protein domains of the CCCH type linked in tandem. The MBNL1 protein specifically binds to double stranded CUG RNA expansions. The Zinc Finger domains play a role in both protein:protein contacts as well as RNA:protein contacts when bound to an oligonucleotide.
