= Nusinersen =

Medication used for spinal muscular atrophy

Clinical data
- Trade names: Spinraza
- Other names: IONIS-SMN_{Rx}, ISIS-SMN_{Rx}
- AHFS/Drugs.com: Monograph
- MedlinePlus: a617010
- License data: US DailyMed: Nusinersen
- Pregnancy category: AU: B1
- Routes of administration: Intrathecal
- ATC code: M09AX07 (WHO)

Legal status
- Legal status: AU: S4 (Prescription only); CA: ℞-only; UK: POM (Prescription only); US: ℞-only; EU: Rx-only

Pharmacokinetic data
- Bioavailability: 100% (intrathecal)
- Protein binding: <25% (in CSF), >94% (in plasma)
- Metabolism: Exonuclease (3'- and 5')-mediated hydrolysis
- Elimination half-life: 135–177 days (in CSF), 63–87 days (in plasma)

Identifiers
- IUPAC name: all-P-ambo-2'-O-(2-Methoxyethyl)-5-methyl-P-thiouridylyl-(3'→5')-2'-O-(2-methoxyethyl)-5-methyl-P-thiocytidylyl-(3'→5')-2'-O-(2-methoxyethyl)-P-thioadenylyl-(3'→5')-2'-O-(2-methoxyethyl)-5-methyl-P-thiocytidylyl-(3'→5')-2'-O-(2-methoxyethyl)-5-methyl-P-thiouridylyl-(3'→5')-2'-O-(2-methoxyethyl)-5-methyl-P-thiouridylyl-(3'→5')-2'-O-(2-methoxyethyl)-5-methyl-P-thiouridylyl-(3'→5')-2'-O-(2-methoxyethyl)-5-methyl-P-thiocytidylyl-(3'→5')-2'-O-(2-methoxyethyl)-P-thioadenylyl-(3'→5')-2'-O-(2-methoxyethyl)-5-methyl-P-thiouridylyl-(3'→5')-2'-O-(2-methoxyethyl)-P-thioadenylyl-(3'→5')-2'-O-(2-methoxyethyl)-P-thioadenylyl-(3'→5')-2'-O-(2-methoxyethyl)-5-methyl-P-thiouridylyl-(3'→5')-2'-O-(2-methoxyethyl)-P-thioguanylyl-(3'→5')-2'-O-(2-methoxyethyl)-5-methyl-P-thiocytidylyl-(3'→5')-2'-O-(2-methoxyethyl)-5-methyl-P-thiouridylyl-(3'→5')-2'-O-(2-methoxyethyl)-P-thioguanylyl-(3'→5')-2'-O-(2-methoxyethyl)guanosine
- CAS Number: 1258984-36-9
- PubChem CID: 124037382
- DrugBank: DB13161
- ChemSpider: 34983394
- UNII: 5Z9SP3X666
- KEGG: D10881; as salt: D10791

Chemical and physical data
- Formula: C_{234}H_{323}N_{61}Na_{17}O_{128}P_{17}S_{17}
- Molar mass: 7500.86 g·mol^{−1}
- SMILES: Cc1cn(c(=O)[nH]c1=O)[C@H]2[C@@H]([C@@H]([C@H](O2)CO)OP(=S)(O)OC[C@@H]3[C@H]([C@H]([C@@H](O3)n4cc(c(nc4=O)N)C)OCCOC)OP(=S)(O)OC[C@@H]5[C@H]([C@H]([C@@H](O5)n6cnc7c6ncnc7N)OCCOC)OP(=S)(O)OC[C@@H]8[C@H]([C@H]([C@@H](O8)n9cc(c(nc9=O)N)C)OCCOC)OP(=S)(O)OC[C@@H]1[C@H]([C@H]([C@@H](O1)n1cc(c(=O)[nH]c1=O)C)OCCOC)OP(=S)(O)OC[C@@H]1[C@H]([C@H]([C@@H](O1)n1cc(c(=O)[nH]c1=O)C)OCCOC)OP(=S)(O)OC[C@@H]1[C@H]([C@H]([C@@H](O1)n1cc(c(=O)[nH]c1=O)C)OCCOC)OP(=S)(O)OC[C@@H]1[C@H]([C@H]([C@@H](O1)n1cc(c(nc1=O)N)C)OCCOC)OP(=S)(O)OC[C@@H]1[C@H]([C@H]([C@@H](O1)n1cnc2c1ncnc2N)OCCOC)OP(=S)(O)OC[C@@H]1[C@H]([C@H]([C@@H](O1)n1cc(c(=O)[nH]c1=O)C)OCCOC)OP(=S)(O)OC[C@@H]1[C@H]([C@H]([C@@H](O1)n1cnc2c1ncnc2N)OCCOC)OP(=S)(O)OC[C@@H]1[C@H]([C@H]([C@@H](O1)n1cnc2c1ncnc2N)OCCOC)OP(=S)(O)OC[C@@H]1[C@H]([C@H]([C@@H](O1)n1cc(c(=O)[nH]c1=O)C)OCCOC)OP(=S)(O)OC[C@@H]1[C@H]([C@H]([C@@H](O1)n1cnc2c1nc([nH]c2=O)N)OCCOC)OP(=S)(O)OC[C@@H]1[C@H]([C@H]([C@@H](O1)n1cc(c(nc1=O)N)C)OCCOC)OP(=S)(O)OC[C@@H]1[C@H]([C@H]([C@@H](O1)n1cc(c(=O)[nH]c1=O)C)OCCOC)OP(=S)(O)OC[C@@H]1[C@H]([C@H]([C@@H](O1)n1cnc2c1nc([nH]c2=O)N)OCCOC)OP(=S)(O)OC[C@@H]1[C@H]([C@H]([C@@H](O1)n1cnc2c1nc([nH]c2=O)N)OCCOC)O)OCCOC
- InChI: InChI=1S/C234H340N61O128P17S17/c1-106-66-278(224(308)261-178(106)235)205-162(356-50-32-338-14)144(119(391-205)79-373-425(320,442)407-143-117(77-296)389-204(161(143)355-49-31-337-13)282-70-110(5)193(298)271-228(282)312)410-431(326,448)383-89-129-154(172(366-60-42-348-24)215(401-129)289-99-254-135-182(239)246-95-250-186(135)289)419-436(331,453)379-81-121-145(163(357-51-33-339-15)206(393-121)279-67-107(2)179(236)262-225(279)309)408-426(321,443)375-83-123-149(167(361-55-37-343-19)210(395-123)284-72-112(7)195(300)273-230(284)314)413-429(324,446)378-86-125-150(168(362-56-38-344-20)211(397-125)285-73-113(8)196(301)274-231(285)315)414-430(325,447)377-85-124-148(166(360-54-36-342-18)209(396-124)283-71-111(6)194(299)272-229(283)313)412-428(323,445)374-80-120-147(165(359-53-35-341-17)208(392-120)281-69-109(4)181(238)264-227(281)311)411-432(327,449)384-90-130-155(173(367-61-43-349-25)216(402-130)290-100-255-136-183(240)247-96-251-187(136)290)420-437(332,454)381-87-127-152(170(364-58-40-346-22)213(399-127)287-75-115(10)198(303)276-233(287)317)415-433(328,450)385-91-131-157(175(369-63-45-351-27)218(403-131)292-102-257-138-185(242)249-98-253-189(138)292)422-440(335,457)386-92-132-156(174(368-62-44-350-26)217(404-132)291-101-256-137-184(241)248-97-252-188(137)291)421-438(333,455)382-88-128-153(171(365-59-41-347-23)214(400-128)288-76-116(11)199(304)277-234(288)318)417-435(330,452)388-94-134-159(177(371-65-47-353-29)220(406-134)295-105-260-141-192(295)267-223(245)270-202(141)307)423-439(334,456)380-82-122-146(164(358-52-34-340-16)207(394-122)280-68-108(3)180(237)263-226(280)310)409-427(322,444)376-84-126-151(169(363-57-39-345-21)212(398-126)286-74-114(9)197(302)275-232(286)316)416-434(329,451)387-93-133-158(176(370-64-46-352-28)219(405-133)294-104-259-140-191(294)266-222(244)269-201(140)306)418-424(319,441)372-78-118-142(297)160(354-48-30-336-12)203(390-118)293-103-258-139-190(293)265-221(243)268-200(139)305/h66-76,95-105,117-134,142-177,203-220,296-297H,30-65,77-94H2,1-29H3,(H,319,441)(H,320,442)(H,321,443)(H,322,444)(H,323,445)(H,324,446)(H,325,447)(H,326,448)(H,327,449)(H,328,450)(H,329,451)(H,330,452)(H,331,453)(H,332,454)(H,333,455)(H,334,456)(H,335,457)(H2,235,261,308)(H2,236,262,309)(H2,237,263,310)(H2,238,264,311)(H2,239,246,250)(H2,240,247,251)(H2,241,248,252)(H2,242,249,253)(H,271,298,312)(H,272,299,313)(H,273,300,314)(H,274,301,315)(H,275,302,316)(H,276,303,317)(H,277,304,318)(H3,243,265,268,305)(H3,244,266,269,306)(H3,245,267,270,307)/t117-,118-,119-,120-,121-,122-,123-,124-,125-,126-,127-,128-,129-,130-,131-,132-,133-,134-,142-,143-,144-,145-,146-,147-,148-,149-,150-,151-,152-,153-,154-,155-,156-,157-,158-,159-,160-,161-,162-,163-,164-,165-,166-,167-,168-,169-,170-,171-,172-,173-,174-,175-,176-,177-,203-,204-,205-,206-,207-,208-,209-,210-,211-,212-,213-,214-,215-,216-,217-,218-,219-,220-,424?,425?,426?,427?,428?,429?,430?,431?,432?,433?,434?,435?,436?,437?,438?,439?,440?/m1/s1; Key:WWFDJIVIDXJAQR-FFWSQMGZSA-N

Nusinersen, marketed as Spinraza, is a medication used in treating spinal muscular atrophy (SMA), a rare neuromuscular disorder. In December 2016, it became the first approved drug used in treating this disorder.

Since the condition it treats is so rare, nusinersen has so-called "orphan drug" designation in the United States and the European Union.

== Medical uses ==
The drug is used to treat spinal muscular atrophy associated with a mutation in the SMN1 gene. It is administered directly to the central nervous system (CNS) using intrathecal injection.

In clinical trials, the drug halted the disease progression. In around 60% of infants affected by type 1 spinal muscular atrophy, it improves motor function.

== Side effects ==
People treated with nusinersen had an increased risk of upper and lower respiratory infections and congestion, ear infections, constipation, pulmonary aspiration, teething, and scoliosis. There is a risk that growth of infants and children might be stunted. In older clinical trial subjects, the most common adverse events were headache, back pain, and other adverse effects from the spinal injection, such as post-dural-puncture headache.

Although not observed in the trial patients, a reduction in platelets as well as a risk of kidney damage are theoretical risks for antisense drugs and therefore platelets and kidney function should be monitored during treatment.

In 2018, several cases of communicating hydrocephalus in children and adults treated with nusinersen emerged; it remains unclear whether this was drug related.

== Pharmacology ==
Spinal muscular atrophy is caused by loss-of-function mutations in the SMN1 gene which codes for survival motor neuron (SMN) protein. People survive owing to low amounts of the SMN protein produced from the SMN2 gene. Nusinersen modulates alternative splicing of the SMN2 gene, functionally converting it into SMN1 gene, thus increasing the level of SMN protein in the CNS.

The drug distributes to CNS and peripheral tissues.

The half-life is estimated to be 135 to 177 days in cerebrospinal fluid (CSF) and 63 to 87 days in blood plasma. The drug is metabolized via exonuclease (3′- and 5′)-mediated hydrolysis and does not interact with CYP450 enzymes. The primary route of elimination is likely by urinary excretion for nusinersen and its metabolites.

== Chemistry ==
Nusinersen is an antisense oligonucleotide in which the 2'-hydroxy groups of the ribofuranosyl rings are replaced with 2'-O-2-methoxyethyl groups and the phosphate linkages are replaced with phosphorothioate linkages.

== History ==
Nusinersen was developed in a collaboration between Adrian Krainer at Cold Spring Harbor Laboratory and Ionis Pharmaceuticals (formerly called Isis Pharmaceuticals). Initial work of target discovery of nusinersen was done by Ravindra N. Singh and co-workers at the University of Massachusetts Medical School funded by Cure SMA.

Starting in 2012, Ionis partnered with Biogen on development and, in 2015, Biogen acquired an exclusive license to the drug for a US$75 million license fee, milestone payments up to US$150 million, and tiered royalties thereafter; Biogen also paid the costs of development subsequent to taking the license. The license to Biogen included licenses to intellectual property that Ionis had acquired from Cold Spring Harbor Laboratory and University of Massachusetts.

In November 2016, the new drug application was accepted under the FDA's priority review process on the strength of the Phase III trial and the unmet need, and was also accepted for review at the European Medicines Agency (EMA) at that time. It was approved by the FDA in December 2016 and by EMA in May 2017 as the first drug to treat SMA. Subsequently, nusinersen was approved to treat SMA in Canada (July 2017), Japan (July 2017), Brazil (August 2017), Switzerland (September 2017), and China (February 2019).

In 2023, additional clinical trials continued to validate the efficacy of nusinersen, particularly emphasizing the benefits of early intervention. The trials demonstrated significant improvements in motor function and survival rates among infants with SMA Type 1, underscoring the importance of prompt treatment to achieve optimal clinical outcomes.

== Society and culture ==
=== Economics ===
Nusinersen list price in the USA is US$125,000 per injection which puts the treatment cost at US$750,000 in the first year and US$375,000 annually after that. According to The New York Times, this places nusinersen "among the most expensive drugs in the world".

In October 2017, the authorities in Denmark recommended nusinersen for use only in a small subset of people with SMA type 1 (young babies) and refused to offer it as a standard treatment for all other people with SMA quoting an "unreasonably high price" compared to the benefit.

Norwegian authorities rejected the funding in October 2017 because the price of the medicine was "unethically high". In February 2018, the funding was approved for people under 18 years old. In April 2023 funding was expanded to include adults.

In August 2018, the National Institute for Health and Care Excellence (NICE), which weighs the cost-effectiveness of therapies for the NHS in England and Wales, recommended against offering nusinersen to people with SMA. Children with SMA type 1 were treated in the UK under a Biogen-funded expanded access programme; after enrolling 80 children, the scheme closed to new people in November 2018. In May 2019, however, NICE reversed its stance and announced its decision to recommend nusinersen for use across a wide spectrum of SMA for a 5-year period.

The Irish Health Service Executive decided in February 2019 that nusinersen was too expensive to fund, saying the cost would be about €600,000 per patient in the first year and around €380,000 a year thereafter "with an estimated budget impact in excess of €20 million over a five-year period" for the 25 children with SMA living in Ireland. Both the manufacturer and patient groups disputed the numbers and pointed out that actual pricing arrangements for Ireland are in line with the negotiated price for the BeneluxA initiative which Ireland has been a member of since June 2018.

As of May 2019, nusinersen was available in public healthcare in more than 40 countries.

In December 2021, nusinersen was included in the extended insurance coverage of China, and the price was reduced from ¥697,000 per vial to around ¥33,000 (~US$5,100) per vial.
