= Splicing regulatory element =

Splicing regulatory element (SRE) are cis-acting sequences in pre-mRNA, which either enhance or silence (suppress) the splicing of introns, or in general regulates the constitutive or alternative splicing of this pre-mRNA. SREs recruit trans-acting splicing factors to activate or suppress the splice site recognition or spliceosome assembly. The "context dependence" of SREs is categorized into at least two studied groups: (a) the location-dependent activity of SREs: the activity varies with the relative positions of SREs in pre-mRNA; (b) the gene-dependent activity of SREs: the SRE activity observed in one gene is lost when the SRE is moved to another gene.

SREs are:

present in exons: exonic splicing enhancers (ESEs), exonic splicing silencers (ESSs)
present in introns: intronic splicing enhancers (ISEs), intronic splicing silencers (ISSs).
