= Peter Dervan =

American chemist (born 1945)

Peter B. Dervan
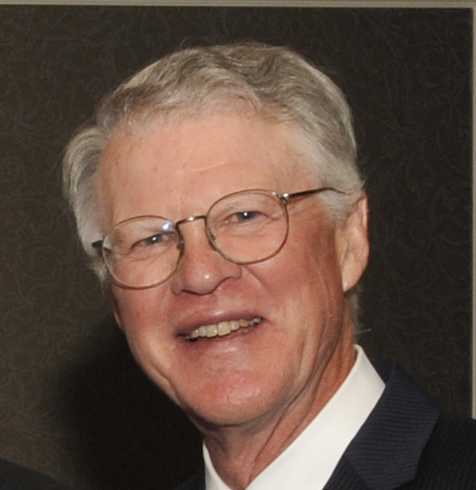
- Dervan in 2017
- Born: June 28, 1945 (age 81); Boston, Massachusetts, U.S.
- Education: Boston College; Yale University
- Spouse: Jacqueline Barton
- Awards: Harvey Prize (2002); National Medal of Science (2006); Priestley Medal (2022)
- Scientific career
- Fields: Organic chemistry
- Workplaces: Yale, Stanford, Caltech
- Thesis: The stereochemistry of the thermal rearrangements of trans- and cis-1,2-dialkenylcyclobutanes (1973)
- Doctoral advisor: Jerome A. Berson
- Doctoral students: Tadhg Begley; Milan Mrksich; Peter G. Schultz; Scott Strobel
- Other notable students: Post-docs: Erick M. Carreira; Amanda E. Hargrove; Laura L. Kiessling; Eric Kool; Anna K. Mapp; Alanna Schepartz

External videos
- "Science is the most fun in the whole wide world", Medal of Science 50 Videos – Peter Dervan and Jacqueline Barton, National Science Foundation

Peter B. Dervan (born June 28, 1945) is the Bren Professor of Chemistry at the California Institute of Technology. The primary focus of his research is the development and study of small organic molecules that can sequence-specifically recognize DNA. The most important of these small molecules are pyrrole–imidazole polyamides. Dervan is credited with influencing "the course of research in organic chemistry through his studies at the interface of chemistry and biology" as a result of his work on "the chemical principles involved in sequence-specific recognition of double helical DNA". He is the recipient of many awards, including the National Medal of Science (2006).

== Early life and education ==
Peter B. Dervan was born on June 28, 1945, in Boston, Massachusetts. He grew up in a family of six in Dorchester, a working-class suburb of Boston. Dervan attended Boston College High School and received his B.S. degree from Boston College in 1967, where professor Francis Bennett sparked his interest in organic chemistry. He began graduate studies at the University of Wisconsin then moved with Jerome A. Berson's research group to Yale University where he completed his graduate research in physical organic chemistry, studying ways in which chemical bonds are created and broken apart. He received his Ph.D. degree from Yale University in 1972, for The Stereochemistry of the Thermal Rearrangements of Trans-1,2-Dialkenylcyclobutanes and Cis-1,2-Dialkenylcyclobutanes. He then became an NIH postdoctoral fellow at Stanford, working with Eugene van Tamelen.

== Career ==
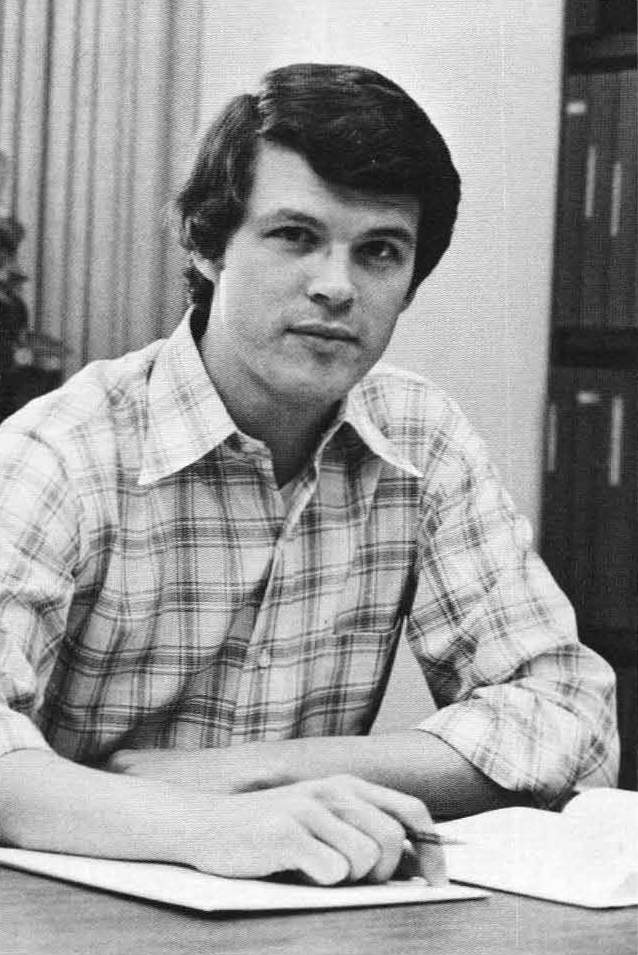
Dervan in 1986

Dervan became an assistant professor of chemistry at Caltech in 1973, joining John D. Roberts, Robert G. Bergman and Robert Ellsworth Ireland in the organic chemistry group. He became an associate professor in 1979, and professor in 1982. He was appointed as the first Bren Professor of Chemistry in 1988. He served as Chair of Caltech's Division of Chemistry and Chemical Engineering from 1994 to 1999. Dervan has published more than 360 papers and taught hundreds of students.

Dervan is a member of the National Academy of Sciences (1986), the American Academy of Arts and Sciences (1987), and the American Philosophical Society (2002). He is an elected member of the French Academy of Sciences (2000) and the Deutsche Akademie der Naturforscher Leopoldina (2004– ).

Dervan is a co-founder and founding member of the Scientific Advisory Board for Gilead Sciences (1987). He served on the Board of Directors for Beckman Coulter beginning in 1997. He served as a Trustee of Yale University (2008–2017). He served as a member of the Board of Scientific Governors of The Scripps Research Institute. In 2014, he presented the ACS Chemical Biology Lecture. As of 2016 he became chair of the scientific advisory board of the Robert A. Welch Foundation.

== Research ==
While teaching a class at Caltech in Advanced Organic Chemistry, Dervan came to a realization that would guide his future career: rather than working to "close" a classic problem that had been previously defined, he would seek to define and "open" a new research area that could be studied for many years. The problem he chose was molecular recognition in biological systems. At the time, DNA sequencing was in its infancy and the human genome project was undreamt of. Dervan chose to apply ideas from synthetic chemistry to biology and the study of DNA, creating novel binding molecules to be used for DNA recognition.

By studying weak intermolecular interactions and creating novel synthetic molecules specific to particular DNA sequences, Dervan has been able to explore the complex biological systems underlying DNA's structure and function. A human cell contains approximately 20,000 genes, whose expression is controlled by the binding of protein transcription factors in the promoter region of each gene. Through pioneering work in DNA recognition, Dervan has determined many of the chemical principles underlying sequence-specific recognition of DNA, and enabled researchers to better understand the mechanism of action of many anti-tumor, anti-viral and anti-biotic drugs.

Dervan determined that small molecules could be synthesized and used to selectively bind DNA at the transcription factor/DNA interface, effectively rewriting the biological codes controlling transcription by acting on the promoters of selected genes. The creation of synthetic small molecules with affinities and sequence specificities for predetermined DNA sequences makes it possible to design cell-permeable molecules for the regulation of gene expression. The use of small molecules to regulate gene expression in living cells has possible application to human medicine.

The most important of these small molecules are pyrrole–imidazole polyamides. Dervan's lab has identified pairing rules to control the DNA sequence specificity of minor-groove binding polyamides that contain the aromatic ring amino acids hydroxypyrrole (Hp), imidazole (Im), and pyrrole (Py).

== Awards ==
Dervan has received a number of awards for both research and teaching, including those listed below. He was awarded the 2006 National Medal of Science in 2007 from President George Bush at the White House for “his fundamental research contributions at the interface of organic chemistry and biology” as well as contributions to education and industry. A minor planet has been named in his honor, 4314 Dervan.

- 1988 – Harrison Howe Award
- 1993 – Arthur C. Cope Award
- 1993 – Willard Gibbs Award
- 1994 – William H. Nichols Medal, for "his outstanding contributions in the field of bioorganic chemistry through the design and synthesis of sequence-specific DNA cleaving molecules."
- 1996 – Maison de la Chimie Foundation Prize
- 1998 – Remsen Award
- 1998 – Kirkwood Medal, for “outstanding research contributions, theoretical or experimental, in the physical sciences.”
- 1999 – Alfred Bader Award
- 1999 – Max Tishler Prize
- 1999 – Linus Pauling Award
- 1999 – Richard C. Tolman Medal
- 2000 – Tetrahedron Prize
- 2002 – Harvey Prize (Israel)
- 2005 – Ronald Breslow Award
- 2005 – Wilbur Cross Medal
- 2006 – National Medal of Science
- 2009 – Frank Westheimer Prize
- 2022 – Priestley Medal

== Personal ==
In 1990, Dervan married Jacqueline Barton, a fellow chemist and professor at Caltech. He has a son, Andrew, from a previous marriage, and a daughter, Elizabeth, from his marriage with Barton. All four hold degrees from Yale University.

== Selected publications ==
- Nickols, N. G.; Dervan, P. B. (2007). "Suppression of Androgen Receptor Mediated Gene Expression by a Sequence-Specific DNA Binding Polyamide". Proc. Natl. Acad. Sci. USA. 104 (25): 10418–10423. Bibcode:2007PNAS..10410418N. doi:10.1073/pnas.0704217104. PMC 1965528. PMID 17566103.
- Yang, F.; Nickols, N. G.; Li, B. C.; Marinov, G. K.; Said, J. W.; Dervan, P. B. (2013). "Antitumor Activity of a Pyrrole-imidazole Polyamide" (PDF). Proc. Natl. Acad. Sci. USA. 110 (5): 1863–1868. Bibcode:2013PNAS..110.1863Y. doi:10.1073/pnas.1222035110. PMC 3562772. PMID 23319609.
