= Branaplam =

Chemical compound

Clinical data
- Other names: LMI070; NVS-SM1

Identifiers
- IUPAC name: (6E)-3-(1H-Pyrazol-4-yl)-6-[3-(2,2,6,6-tetramethylpiperidin-4-yl)oxy-1H-pyridazin-6-ylidene]cyclohexa-2,4-dien-1-one
- CAS Number: 1562338-42-4
- PubChem CID: 89971189
- ChemSpider: 34980709
- UNII: P12R69543A
- KEGG: D12272
- CompTox Dashboard (EPA): DTXSID801337133

Chemical and physical data
- Formula: C_{22}H_{27}N_{5}O_{2}
- Molar mass: 393.491 g·mol^{−1}
- 3D model (JSmol): Interactive image
- SMILES: CC1(CC(CC(N1)(C)C)Oc2ccc(nn2)c3ccc(cc3O)c4c[nH]nc4)C
- InChI: InChI=1S/C22H27N5O2/c1-21(2)10-16(11-22(3,4)27-21)29-20-8-7-18(25-26-20)17-6-5-14(9-19(17)28)15-12-23-24-13-15/h5-9,12-13,16,25,27H,10-11H2,1-4H3,(H,23,24)/b18-17+; Key:YIFFDXMJVNKGBL-ISLYRVAYSA-N; InChI=1S/C22H27N5O2/c1-21(2)10-16(11-22(3,4)27-21)29-20-8-7-18(25-26-20)17-6-5-14(9-19(17)28)15-12-23-24-13-15/h5-9,12-13,16,27-28H,10-11H2,1-4H3,(H,23,24); Key:STWTUEAWRAIWJG-UHFFFAOYSA-N

Branaplam (development codes LMI070 and NVS-SM1) is a pyridazine derivative that is being studied as an experimental drug. It was originally developed by Novartis to treat spinal muscular atrophy (SMA); since 2020 it was being developed to treat Huntington's disease but the trial ended in 2023 due to toxicity concerns.

As a treatment for SMA, branaplam increases the amount of functional survival of motor neuron protein produced by the SMN2 gene through modifying its splicing pattern. It was studied since 2014 in a clinical trial in children with SMA type 1 until the study was discontinued in 2021.

In October 2020, Novartis announced that branaplam reduces the amount of huntingtin protein, which is one of the major therapeutic approaches in Huntington's disease. In 2021, U.S. Food and Drug Administration (FDA) granted an orphan drug status to branaplam for treatment of Huntington's disease, and Novartis announced that they would start clinical trials in 2021. In August 2022, Novartis temporarily halted the dosing with branaplam in its clinical studies, and in December 2022 the company discontinued the study due to negative safety signals.

== Use in biomedical research ==
Branaplam can be used as a so-called X^{on} inducer of splicing for control of gene expression. For example, branaplam was used as an X^{on} inducer to tightly control Cas9 expression with a modified branaplam-sensitive splicing cassette from the SF3B3 gene.
