= Guido Werdnig =

Austrian neurologist

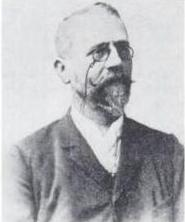
Guido Werdnig (1844–1919)

Guido Werdnig (Ratschach, 20 June 1844 – 26 April 1919) was an Austrian neurologist.

Werdnig, together with Johann Hoffmann of the University of Heidelberg, were the first doctors to describe Werdnig–Hoffmann disease, now known as spinal muscular atrophy type 1.
