= Milan Mrksich =

American chemist (born 1968)

- Born: August 15, 1968 (age 58); Chicago, Illinois
- Education: University of Illinois at Urbana-Champaign (BS); California Institute of Technology (PhD)
- Known for: SAMDI-MS Biochip Technology, Megamolecules
- Title: Vice President for Research; Henry Wade Rogers Professor of Biomedical Engineering at Northwestern University
- Awards: Camille Dreyfus Teacher-Scholar Award; TR100 Innovator Award; Arthur C. Cope Scholar Award; American Institute for Medical and Biological Engineering; Illinois Bio ICON Innovator Awardee
- Scientific career
- Fields: Chemistry; Biomedical Engineering; Cell Biology
- Workplaces: Harvard University; University of Chicago; Northwestern University
- Website: Mrksich Group

Milan Mrksich (born 15 August 1968) is an American chemist. He is the Henry Wade Rogers Professor at Northwestern University with appointments in chemistry, biomedical engineering and cell & developmental biology. He also served as both the founding director of the Center for Synthetic Biology and as an associate director of the Robert H. Lurie Comprehensive Cancer Center at Northwestern. Mrksich also served as the Vice President for Research of Northwestern University.

His research involves the chemistry and synthesis of surfaces that contact biological environments. His laboratory has pioneered several technologies, including strategies to integrate living cells with microelectronic devices, methods to enable high throughput assays for drug discovery, and approaches to making synthetic fusion proteins for applications as therapeutics. Most notably, he developed the SAMDI-MS biochip technology that allows for high-throughput quantification of surface-based biochemical assays using MALDI mass spectrometry. Through SAMDI-MS, Mrksich has become a leader in using label-free technology for drug discovery, founding the company SAMDI Tech in 2011 that primarily serves global pharmaceutical companies. His work has been described in over 240 publications (h-index 98), 500 invited talks, and 18 patents.

== Early life and education ==
Milan Mrksich (Serbian Cyrillic: Милан Мркшић) was born on August 15, 1968, to Serbian immigrants and raised in Justice, Illinois. He graduated from University of Illinois at Urbana-Champaign in 1989 with a B.S. in chemistry working in the laboratory of Steven Zimmerman on molecular tweezers. He completed his PhD in organic chemistry in 1994 from Caltech under chemist Peter B. Dervan. After graduate school, he was an American Chemical Society postdoctoral fellow at Harvard University under chemist George M. Whitesides before joining the faculty at the University of Chicago in 1996. He worked there for 15 years before joining the faculty at Northwestern University in 2011.

== Research history ==
=== Early career ===
Early on as an independent investigator, Mrksich developed and executed the concept of dynamic substrates for cell culture. Here, self-assembled monolayers (SAMs) present cell adhesive ligands with perfect control over density and orientation against a non-adhesive, inert background, such as ethylene glycol. These monolayers can be further modified with electroactive groups that selectively release immobilized ligand when stimulated with an electric potential. Several strategies using this approach were studied in the context of cell signaling, migration, and co-culture. Subsequent cell-based work focused on developing methods to pattern cells on the aforementioned SAMs. The work has mostly utilized microcontact printing to confine adherent cells into defined positions, shapes, and sizes. Ultimately, his group's work has revealed examples of how cellular mechanics and cytoskeletal structure influence phenotype. A primary example of this involved investigating how cell shape exerts control over the differentiation of mesenchymal stem cells. Further work utilized these patterned monolayers to investigate the relationship between various cytoskeletal elements and to observe complex phenotypic differences in patient-derived neuroprogenitor cells. Recent work in the group investigating cell patterning has utilized photoactive adhesive peptides, allowing for local, spatiotemporal control of cell adhesion to study gap junction formation.

=== SAMDI-MS ===
While performing much of the early dynamic substrate and cell patterning work, Mrksich also pioneered an assay platform that utilizes SAMs of alkanethiolates on gold. The monolayers contain capture ligands (e.g. biotin or maleimide) that can selectively immobilize a peptide of interest. Subsequently, the monolayer can treated with a specific enzyme or a complex mixture, such as cell lysate, that can modify the peptide through various biological processes (e.g. phosphorylation). For quality control, the monolayers present these peptides against a background of tri(ethylene glycol) groups to prevent the nonspecific adsorption of protein to the surface that could obfuscate the reaction signal and, therefore, enable quantitative and reproducible assays. Most significantly, the monolayers can be characterized with MALDI mass spectrometry in a technique known as SAMDI-MS, which provides the masses of the substituted alkanethiolates and, therefore, the mass change of the immobilized peptide that results from enzyme activity. The method is compatible with standard array formats and liquid handling robotics, allowing a throughput in the tens of thousands of reactions per day. Importantly, the matrix-assisted laser desorption time-of-flight mass spectrometry (MALDI-TOF) analysis provides a fast and quantitative mass shift readout without the need for labels.

=== Megamolecules ===
Most recently, Mrksich's group has focused on developing a technique for assembling large molecular structures with perfectly defined structures and orientations, known as Megamolecules. This is primarily done through use of fusion proteins and irreversible inhibitor linkers that assemble stable intermediates. Structure-function relationships, including synthesis of cyclic and antibody-mimic structures have been investigated for potential therapeutic application.

== Entrepreneurship ==
Mrksich has been an active entrepreneur over the past twenty years. He co-founded SAMDI Tech in 2011, which uses his label-free assay technology to perform high throughput screens for pharmaceutical companies. SAMDI Tech entered into a partnership with Charles River Laboratories in 2018 and was purchased by CRL in 2023. Mrksich also co-founded WMR Biomedical in 2008, with George Whitesides and Carmichael Roberts to develop resorbable stent materials; this company was renamed Lyra Therapeutics and had an IPO in 2020 (NASDAQ LYRA) and has drug-eluting stents in clinical trials for ear, nose and throat disease, including chronic rhinosinusitis. Mrksich has recently founded ModuMab Therapeutics, which applies his megamolecule technology to creating antibody mimics for a broad range of diseases.

== Service ==
Mrksich has also been active in serving the scientific community in a number of roles. These include his current service as the Scientific Director of the Searle Scholars Program, as a member of the Board of Governors for Argonne National Laboratory, and as a member of the Board of Directors for the Camille & Henry Dreyfus Foundation. His past appointments include service and chairing DARPA’s Defense Sciences Research Council and many program advisory committees.

== Awards and honors ==
- 1990 — National Institutes of Health National Research Service Award
- 1993 — Ralph M. Parsons Foundation Graduate Fellow
- 1994 — American Cancer Society Postdoctoral Fellow
- 1996 — Searle Scholar Award
- 1996 — Camille and Henry Dreyfus New Faculty Award
- 1996 — DARPA Defense Sciences Research Council (2004-, Vice-Chair)
- 1997 — Editorial Board of Langmuir
- 2000 — A.P. Sloan Research Fellow
- 2000 — Camille Dreyfus Teacher-Scholar
- 2000 — WTEC Panel for International Evaluation of Tissue Engineering Programs
- 2001 — Extramural Chair for NIH/BECON Symposium on Biosensors
- 2002 — TR100 Young Innovator Award
- 2002 — International Panel for Review of Materials Research in United Kingdom
- 2003 — Board of Governors for Argonne National Laboratory
- 2003 — American Chemical Society Arthur C. Cope Young Scholar Award
- 2004 — Advisory Board of the Searle Scholars Program (2007-present, Chair)
- 2004 — Editorial Board of Chemical Society Reviews
- 2004 — Editorial Board of Chemistry & Biology
- 2005 — Fellow, American Association for the Advancement of Science
- 2008 — Editorial Board of Small
- 2011 — Founder and Chairman, SAMDI Tech, Inc.
- 2013 — Fellow, American Institute for Medical and Biological Engineering (AIMBE)
- 2014 — Advisory Professor, Institute of Chemical Biology and Nanomedicine, Hunan University
- 2015 — Visiting Professor, Institute for Nanomedicine at NTU, Singapore
- 2016 — iBIO iCON Innovator Award
- 2020 — Pittsburgh Analytical Chemistry Award
- 2022 — Board of Directors, Camille & Henry Dreyfus Foundation

== Personal life ==
Milan lives in Hinsdale, Illinois with his two children.
