= Arrakis Therapeutics =

Biotechnology company in Massachusetts, US

- Type: Private
- Industry: Pharmaceutical
- Founded: 2015
- Headquarters: Waltham, Massachusetts, United States
- Key people: Jennifer Petter, PhD, Founder and Chief Innovation Officer, Michael Gilman, PhD, CEO
- Website: www.arrakistx.com

Arrakis Therapeutics is a biopharmaceutical company developing oral medicines that target RNA to treat a range of diseases. The company is based in Waltham, Massachusetts, and was founded in 2015 by Jennifer Petter, now the company's Chief Innovation Officer. In October 2016, Michael Gilman, a former Biogen executive, was named CEO.

In 2017, the company raised a $38 million investment from venture capital firm Canaan Partners as well as Celgene and Pfizer. Arrakis was founded to focus on purposefully discovering RNA-targeting small molecule drugs. Other companies had previously discovered drugs based on RNA-targeting small molecules, however, they were found opportunistically.

Arrakis has been able to identify RNA binding sites where small molecule drugs can bind using a bioinformatics tool. The company also utilizes chemical biology tools to confirm whether their compounds are inhibiting RNA cells, and also whether the compounds are specifically targeting the disease-associated RNA.

In April 2019, Arrakis raised $75 million in financing to continue its development of small-molecule drugs that target RNA. In April 2020, Arrakis signed a $190 million licensing agreement with Swiss multinational healthcare company Roche for exclusive rights to Arrakis' drugs developed to treat a range of diseases, including cancer. In January 2022, Arrakis entered a partnership with biopharmaceutical company Amgen to develop oral drugs that target and degrade RNA. Amgen agreed to make an upfront payment of $75 million to Arrakis, with the possibility of further funding if research and development proceed as planned.
