= Medicinal Research Reviews =

Peer-reviewed scientific journal

- Discipline: Medicinal chemistry, pharmacology, pharmacy
- Language: English
- Edited by: Amanda E. Hargrove

Publication details
- History: 1980–present
- Publisher: Wiley
- Frequency: Bimonthly
- Open access: Hybrid
- Impact factor: 12.388 (2021)

Standard abbreviations
- ISO 4: Med. Res. Rev.

Indexing
- CODEN: MRREDD
- ISSN: 0198-6325 (print); 1098-1128 (web)
- LCCN: 81641271
- OCLC no.: 38745824

Links
- Journal homepage

Medicinal Research Reviews is a bimonthly peer-reviewed scientific journal that publishes reviews on topics related to medicinal research. It is published by Wiley and was established in 1980. The editor-in-chief is Amanda E. Hargrove (Duke University).

The journal publishes critical reviews of topics include pathophysiology, genomics and proteomics, and clinical characteristics of important drugs.

== Abstracting and indexing ==
The journal is abstracted and indexed in:

- BIOSIS Previews
- Current Contents/Agriculture, Biology & Environmental Sciences
- ProQuest databases
- Science Citation Index Expanded
- Scopus

According to the Journal Citation Reports, the journal has a 2021 impact factor of 12.388.
