= Self-complementary adeno-associated virus =

Self-complementary adeno-associated virus (scAAV) is a viral vector engineered from the naturally occurring adeno-associated virus (AAV) to be used as a tool for gene therapy. Use of recombinant AAV (rAAV) has been successful in clinical trials addressing a variety of diseases. This lab-made progeny of rAAV is termed "self-complementary" because the coding region has been designed to form an intra-molecular double-stranded DNA template. A rate-limiting step for the standard AAV genome involves the second-strand synthesis since the typical AAV genome is a single-stranded DNA template. However, this is not the case for scAAV genomes: upon infection, rather than waiting for cell mediated synthesis of the second strand, the two complementary halves of scAAV will associate to form one double stranded DNA (dsDNA) unit that is ready for immediate replication and transcription, crucially allowing for faster expression of the viral payload. The caveat of this expediated construction is that instead of the full coding capacity found in rAAV (4.7–6kb) scAAV can only hold about half of that amount (≈2.4kb).

In gene therapy application utilizing rAAV, the virus transduces the cell with a single stranded DNA (ssDNA) flanked by two inverted terminal repeats (ITRs). These ITRs form hairpins at the end of the sequence to serve as primers to initiate synthesis of the second strand before subsequent steps of infection can begin. The second strand synthesis is considered to be one of several blocks to efficient infection. Additional advantages of scAAV include increased and prolonged transgene expression in vitro and in vivo, as well as "higher in vivo DNA stability and more effective circularization."

== In gene therapy ==
scAAV is an attractive vector for use in gene therapy for many reasons. Its parent vector, AAV, is already being used in clinical trials. Due to a variety of scAAV serotypes available, scientists can choose a serotype which has properties desirable for their therapy. Selecting only a subset of cells improves specificity and lowers the risk of being inhibited by the immune system. Different scAAV and AAV serotypes can efficiently transfect a variety of cellular targets. Like all vector-based approaches to gene therapy, one obstacle in translating therapies from pre-clinical trials into a human clinical application will be the production of large quantities of highly concentrated virus. One disadvantage that scAAV faces is that due to robust gene expression, transgene products delivered via scAAV elicit a stronger immune response than those same transgenes delivered via a single-stranded AAV vector.

== Virus classification ==
Like AAV, scAAV is a member of the family Parvoviridae, commonly known as parvoviruses. These viruses are nonenveloped, single-strand DNA (ssDNA) viruses. Within Parvoviridae, scAAV further belongs to the Dependovirus genus, characteristically defined by an inability to replicate on their own. In nature, these viruses depend on another virus to provide replication machinery; adeno-associated virus can only replicate during an active infection of adenovirus or some types of herpesvirus. In lab use, this obstacle is overcome by addition of the helper plasmids, which exogenously expresses replication genes which AAV itself lacks.

== Viral replication ==
As a dependovirus, scAAV remains in a latent state within the cell until the cell experiences certain permissive conditions. These can include presence of a helper virus infection (such as adenovirus) or other toxic events such as exposure to UV light or carcinogens. Because the endogenous rep ORF has been replaced with transgene, exogenously provided rep genes encode the proteins required for genome replication and other viral life cycle components. The ITRs located 5' and 3' of the viral genome serve as the origin of replication.

== Viral packaging ==
Like the rep ORF, scAAV's cap ORF has been replaced by transgene and therefore is provided exogenously in a lab environment. The genes encoded in this ORF build capsid proteins and are responsible (along with intracellular processing) for conveying target specificity. Rep proteins participate in the integration of the genome into preformed capsids. Despite the fact that scAAV is designed to form dsDNA upon infection, the two complementary strands are not packaged in a double stranded manner. Parvoviruses package their viral genome such that the ssDNA bases come in contact with the amino acids on the inside of the viral capsid. Thus the sequence of scAAV is likely unwound by a virally encoded DNA helicase before being packaged into viral protein capsid.
