= Johann Hoffmann (neurologist) =

German neurologist

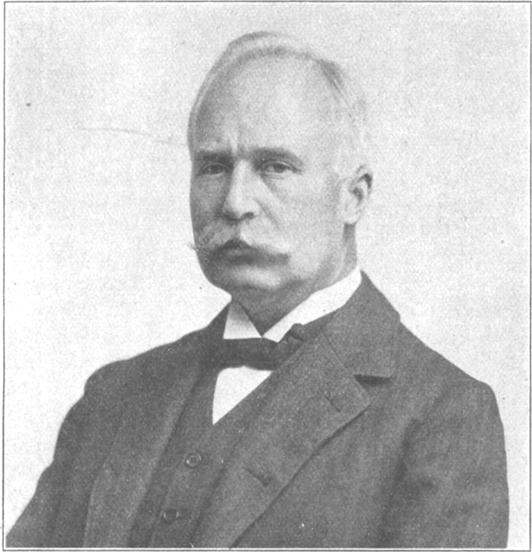
Johann Hoffmann (1857-1919)

Johann Hoffmann (28 March 1857 – 1 November 1919) was a German neurologist born in Hahnheim.

He is remembered for describing Hoffmann's reflex and Werdnig–Hoffmann disease (now spinal muscular atrophy type 1). He is also known for the adult-onset hypothyroid myopathy, Hoffmann syndrome. He was educated at Worms and studied medicine at Heidelberg. He worked under Professor Wilhelm Erb, and succeeded him as head of neurology at Heidelberg.

Hoffmann died in Heidelberg.
