= Exonic splicing enhancer =

DNA sequence motif

In molecular biology, an exonic splicing enhancer (ESE) is a DNA sequence motif consisting of 6 bases within an exon that directs, or enhances, accurate splicing of heterogeneous nuclear RNA (hnRNA) or pre-mRNA into messenger RNA (mRNA).

== Introduction ==
Short sequences of DNA are transcribed to RNA; then this RNA is translated to a protein. A gene located in DNA will contain introns and exons. Part of the process of preparing the RNA includes splicing out the introns, sections of RNA that do not code for the protein. The presence of exonic splicing enhancers is essential for proper identification of splice sites by the cellular machinery.

== Role in splicing ==
SR proteins bind to and promote exon splicing in regions with ESEs, while heterogeneous ribonucleoprotein particles (hnRNPs) bind to and block exon splicing in regions with exonic splicing silencers. Both types of proteins are involved in the assembly and proper functioning of spliceosomes.

During RNA splicing, U2 small nuclear RNA auxiliary factor 1 (U2AF35) and U2AF2 (U2AF65) interact with the branch site and the 3' splice site of the intron to form the lariat. It is thought that SR proteins that bind to ESEs promote exon splicing by increasing interactions with U2AF35 and U2AF65.

Mutation of exonic splicing enhancer motifs is a significant contributor to genetic disorders and some cancers. Simple point mutations in ESEs can inhibit affinity for splicing factors and alter alternative splicing, leading to altered mRNA sequence and protein translation. A field of genetic research is dedicated to determining the location and significance of ESE motifs in vivo.

== Research ==
Computational methods were used to identify 238 candidate ESEs. ESEs are clinically significant because synonymous point mutations previously thought to be silent mutations located in an ESEs can lead to exon skipping and the production of a non functioning protein.

Disruption of an exon splicing enhancer in exon 3 of MLH1 gene is the cause of HNPCC (hereditary nonpolyposis colorectal cancer) in a Quebec family.

There is evidence that these 236 hexamers that signal splicing are evolutionarily conserved.

== See also ==
- Exonic splicing silencer (ESS)
