= SMN2 =

Protein-coding gene in humans

Identifiers
- Aliases: SMN2, BCD541, C-BCD541, GEMIN1, SMNC, TDRD16B, survival of motor neuron 2, centromeric, survival motor neuron 2, centromeric
- External IDs: OMIM: 601627; MGI: 109257; GeneCards: SMN2
Available structures
PDB	Ortholog search: PDBe RCSB
PDB	List of PDB id codes 1G5V, 1MHN, 2LEH, 3S6N, 4A4E, 4A4G, 4GLI, 4NL6, 4NL7, 4QQ6

Gene location (Human)
Chr.	Chromosome 5 (human)
Band	5q13.2	Start	70,049,638 bp
Band	5q13.2	End	70,078,522 bp

Gene location (Mouse)
Chr.	Chromosome 13 (mouse)
Band	13 D1|13 52.99 cM	Start	100,261,360 bp
Band	13 D1|13 52.99 cM	End	100,274,198 bp
RNA expression pattern
Bgee	Human / Mouse (ortholog); Top expressed in: epithelium of colon; endometrium; smooth muscle tissue; right uterine tube; olfactory zone of nasal mucosa; rectum; bone marrow; tonsil; muscle of thigh; Descending thoracic aorta / Top expressed in: zygote; yolk sac; epiblast; morula; morula; tail of embryo; embryo; embryo; blastocyst; ventricular zone; More reference expression data
BioGPS	n/a
Gene ontology
Molecular function	protein binding; RNA binding; identical protein binding
Cellular component	cytoplasm; SMN-Sm protein complex; cytosol; Cajal body; nucleoplasm; SMN complex; Z discdkac; neuron projection; cytoplasmic ribonucleoprotein granule; nucleus; gemini of coiled bodies; perikaryon; cell projection
Biological process	DNA-templated transcription, termination; mRNA processing; nervous system development; spliceosomal snRNP assembly; spliceosomal complex assembly; RNA splicing; import into nucleus
Sources:Amigo / QuickGO
Orthologs
Databases	NCBI: entry; OMA: entry
Species	Human	Mouse
Entrez	6607	20595
Ensembl	ENSG00000277773; ENSG00000205571; ENSG00000273772	ENSMUSG00000021645
UniProt	Q16637	P97801
RefSeq (mRNA)	NM_017411; NM_022875; NM_022876; NM_022877	NM_001252629; NM_011420
RefSeq (protein)	NP_059107; NP_075013; NP_075014; NP_075015; NP_000335 NP_001284644; NP_075012	NP_001239558; NP_035550
Location (UCSC)	Chr 5: 70.05 – 70.08 Mb	Chr 13: 100.26 – 100.27 Mb
PubMed search
- Wikidata
View/Edit Human	View/Edit Mouse

Survival of motor neuron 2 (SMN2) is a gene that encodes the SMN protein (full and truncated) in humans.

== Gene ==
The SMN2 gene is part of a 500 kb inverted duplication on chromosome 5q13. This duplicated region contains at least four genes and repetitive elements which make it prone to rearrangements and deletions. The repetitiveness and complexity of the sequence have also caused difficulty in determining the organization of this genomic region. The telomeric (SMN1) and centromeric (SMN2) copies of this gene are nearly identical and encode the same protein. The critical sequence difference between the two genes is a single nucleotide in exon 7, which is thought to be an exon splice enhancer. The nucleotide substitution in SMN2 results in around 80–90% of its transcripts to be a truncated, unstable protein of no biological function (Δ7SMN) and only 10–20% of its transcripts being full-length protein (fl-SMN).

Note that the nine exons of both the telomeric and centromeric copies are designated historically as exon 1, 2a, 2b, and 3–8. It is thought that gene conversion events may involve the two genes, leading to varying copy numbers of each gene.

== Clinical significance ==
While mutations in the telomeric copy are associated with spinal muscular atrophy, mutations in this gene, the centromeric copy, do not lead to disease. This gene may be a modifier of disease caused by mutation in the telomeric copy.
