= Horizon Discovery =

Horizon Discovery Group plc
- Company type: Public limited company
- Industry: Biotechnology
- Founded: 2005
- Founder: Prof. Alberto Bardelli, Dr. Chris Torrance
- Headquarters: Cambridge, United Kingdom
- Number of locations: 4
- Area served: Worldwide
- Key people: Terry Pizzie (CEO), Ian Gilham (Chairman of Board of Directors, 2014)
- Products: Isogenic cell lines; Engineered Haploid cell lines (HAP1); Reporter Kits; Molecular Reference Standards; Model organisms
- Services: Custom cell line development using rAAV, ZFN and CRISPR; Specialized assay services; Drug screening services; Target identification and validation; Combination High-throughput screening (cHTS); Bioproduction
- Number of employees: 400
- Website: Horizon Discovery

Horizon Discovery Group plc (LSE: HZD) ("Horizon"), is a gene editing company that designs and engineers genetically modified cells and then applies them in research and clinical applications in human health.

Horizon offers human disease models and reagents derived from genetically-engineered cells that its customers may use to gain knowledge of the genetic drivers of disease; develop novel drugs or cell therapies targeted at these genetic drivers; and develop companion diagnostics that predict patient response in the clinic.

Horizon is headquartered in Cambridge, UK, and is listed on the London Stock Exchange’s AIM market under the ticker “HZD”.

Horizon signed agreements in December 2019 and January 2020 with Mammoth Biosciences to combine Mammoth's intellectual property in CRISPR with Horizon's expertise in Chinese hamster ovary cells.

Perkin-Elmer acquired Horizon Discovery for $383 million (£296 million) in November 2020. Due to Perkin-Elmer split, since May 2023 Horizon Discovery is now part of Revvity, Inc.

== Gene Editing ==
Gene editing is the process by which specific changes are made to the sequence of a gene within the context of a host cell. By editing the code of a patient-derived cell to introduce or repair a genetic change believed to drive disease, a patient’s disease can be reproduced in a laboratory setting, letting researchers ask important biological questions of potential drugs or cell therapies earlier in the drug discovery process.

Through its gene editing platform, Horizon is able to alter genes in most human or mammalian cell lines. Horizon now offers over 23,000 cell line pairs that model the mutations found in genetically based diseases.

These ‘patients-in-a-test-tube’ are may be used to identify the effect of individual or compound genetic mutations on drug activity, patient responsiveness, and resistance, which may lead to prediction of which patient sub-groups will respond to currently available and future drug treatments.

Once built, engineered cells can act as product manufacturing engines, yielding related cell and reagent products that can be used as research tools or molecular diagnostic reference standards or as a means to generate advanced in vivo models.
