= Bardelli =

Bardelli is an Italian surname. Notable people with the surname include:

- Alberto Bardelli (born 1967), Italian geneticist and cancer researcher
- Alessandro Bardelli (1583–1633), Italian painter
- Alessandro Bardelli (rowing) (1914–2009), Italian coxswain
