= Molecular reference standards =

Molecular/Genomic reference standards are a class of "controls" or standards used to check the performance of molecular diagnostic assays. Molecular/Genomic Reference Materials (RMs) are selected or engineered to model a specific genetic biomarker as it occurs in a patient biopsy. Reference materials (RM) are used for a calibration of the measuring system, for assessment of a measurement procedure, for assigning values to materials, or for quality control.

== Molecular reference materials ==
Molecular reference standards are available in a variety of formats, each of which has strengths and weaknesses. These materials range from synthetic DNA oligonucleotides or patient-derived genomic DNA, to actual patient tissue biopsies with known mutation status.

Reference Material	Benefit	Drawback
Recombinant plasmids or synthesized oligonucleotides	Cheap and easy to synthesize. Can control for multiple alleles in a single reaction.	Do not resemble complexity of the whole genome. Risk of false positives.
Cell Line Genomic DNA (gDNA)	Mimics complexity of the whole genome.	Can only control for one or a few alleles/genotypes or targets at a time.
Cell Line Mixtures	Mimics complexity of the whole genome. Can control for multiple alleles in a single reactions.	Does not mimic the "isogenic" or similar genetic background between different cells in a tumour.
Genetically modified cell line gDNA	Mimics complexity of the whole genome. Ability to dilute modified gDNA with unmodified gDNA.	Can only control for one or a few alleles/genotypes or targets at a time.
Genetically modified cell line mixtures	Mimics complexity of the whole genome. Ability to dilute modified gDNA with unmodified gDNA. Mimics the "isogenic" background of tumour cells.	----
Patient biopsy samples	Completely representative.	Not a sustainable source.

== Proficiency schemes ==
Proficiency schemes involve the distribution of blinded reference materials to subscription laboratories, and the subsequent scoring and assessment of the proficiency of those labs in their molecular diagnostic testing.

Proficiency schemes are usually organized by not-for-profit organizations, usually government affiliated, to which hundreds of laboratories may subscribe. These schemes are funded with the subscription fees paid by each member laboratory.

Proficiency schemes have historically relied upon patient biopsies with known mutation status for distribution to member laboratories. However, due to the significant rise in the number of labs performing molecular testing (in turn caused by the increase in the number of available targeted drugs whose prescription is linked to the presence or absence of a particular biomarker), patient samples are becoming an unsustainable source of reference material. Increasingly, proficiency scheme organizers are turning to genetically modified cell lines as a sustainable and well defined source of reference material.

Some of the largest proficiency scheme organizers in the world include:

- College of American Pathologists (CAP) – USA
- European Molecular Quality Network (EMQN) – UK, Europe, EMEA
- United Kingdom National External Quality Assessment Scheme (NEQAS) – UK, Europe, EMEA

== Sources and external links ==
Sources of Certified Reference Materials (CRM) include:

- Institute for Reference Materials and Measurements
- NIBSC
- NIST
- Horizon Discovery Reference Standards
- Maine Molecular Quality Controls
- Molecular Controls/ Seracare Life Sciences
- World Health Organization - International Reference Materials

More Information can be found on the CDC and Eurogentest webpages.

Cell Line Repositories

- American Type Culture Collection (ATCC)
- Coriell Cell Repositories
- German Collection of Microorganisms and Cell Cultures
- Health Protection Agency Culture Collections
- Japanese Collection of Research Bioresources
- Riken Bioresource Center

=== External links ===
- College of American Pathologists
- European Molecular Quality Network
- United Kingdom National External Quality Assessment Scheme
