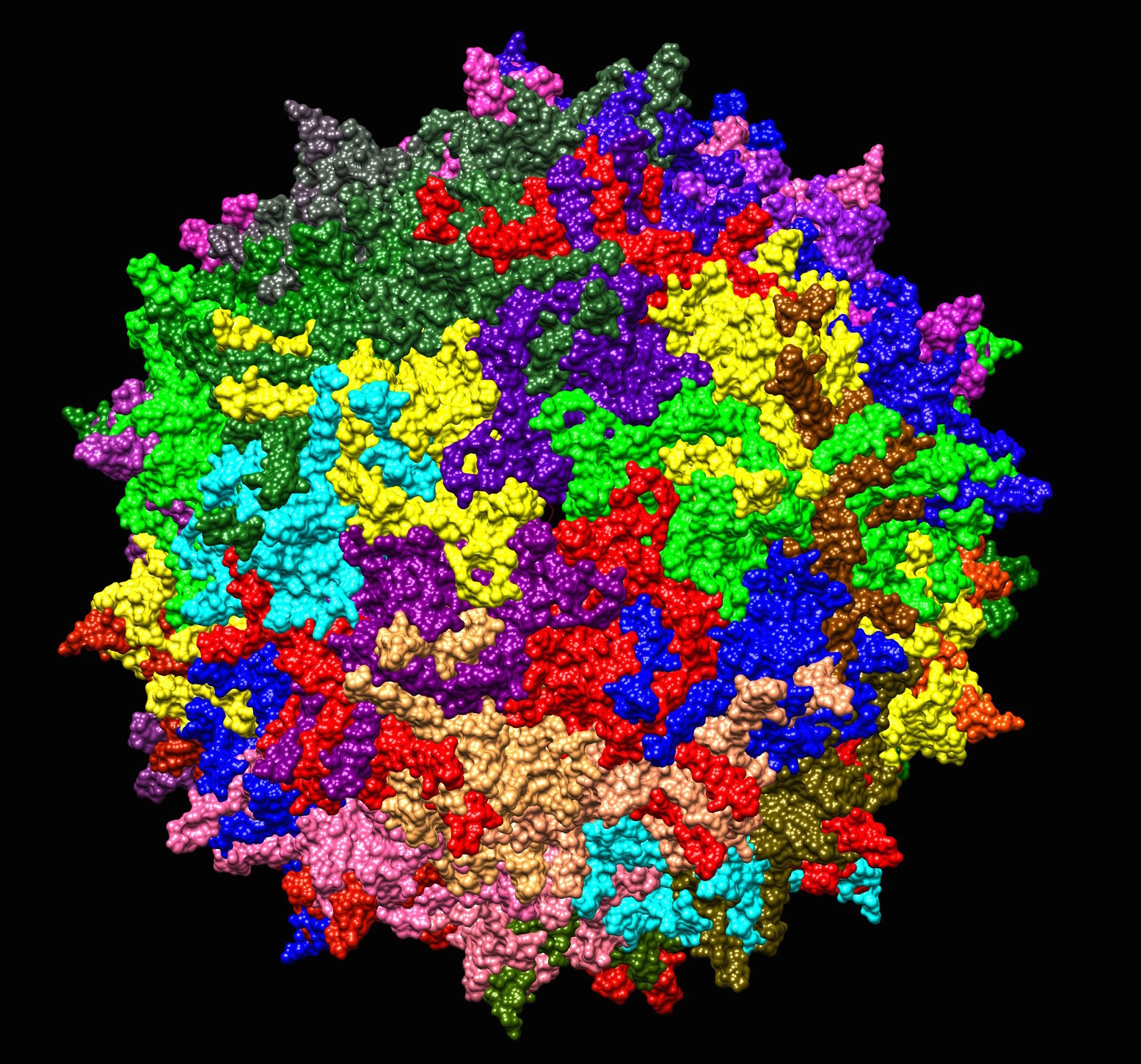
- Adeno-associated virus serotype 2 structure from 1LP3. One fivefold axis shown center.

Scientific classification
- (unranked): Virus
- Realm: Floreoviria
- Kingdom: Shotokuvirae
- Phylum: Cossaviricota
- Class: Quintoviricetes
- Order: Piccovirales
- Family: Parvoviridae
- Subfamily: Parvovirinae
- Genus: Dependoparvovirus

Viruses included:
- Adeno-associated dependoparvovirus A; Adeno-associated dependoparvovirus B

= Adeno-associated virus =

Species of virus

Adeno-associated viruses (AAV) are small viruses that infect humans and some other primate species. They belong to the genus Dependoparvovirus, which in turn belongs to the family Parvoviridae. They are small (approximately 26 nm in diameter) replication-defective, non-enveloped viruses and have linear single-stranded DNA (ssDNA) genomes of approximately 4.8 kilobases (kb).

Several features make AAV an attractive candidate for creating viral vectors in the field of molecular biology including animal modeling and the creation of isogenic human disease models. Vectors using AAV can infect both dividing and quiescent cells and persist in an non-integrated extrachromosomal state into the genome of the host cell. Low level integration into the host genome occurs, particularly in the wild type virus setting.

Recombinant or replication-defective AAV has emerged an important technology in the field of gene therapy. This has now led to multiple approved drugs leveraging its gene delivery often for genetic disorders such as Spinal Muscular Atrophy, forms of blindness, and hemophilia. The use of AAV has its limitations including a 4.7-5.0kb loading capacity and adverse events, particularly at very high dose levels.

In March 2023, a series of Nature papers detected high titres of adeno-associated virus 2 (AAV2), alongside adenovirus and herpesvirus, in samples from a wave of childhood hepatitis. One paper suggested that AAV2 co-infection may contribute to more serious liver disease than infection with only adeno- or herpesviruses and that the causal link remains to be established.

== History ==
The adeno-associated virus (AAV), previously thought to be a contaminant in adenovirus preparations, was first identified as a dependoparvovirus in the 1960s in the laboratories of Bob Atchison at University of Pittsburgh and Wallace Rowe at the NIH. Serological studies in humans subsequently indicated that, despite being present in people infected by helper viruses such as adenovirus or herpes virus, AAV was thought to be not associated with disease. At present, adeno-associated virus (AAV) vectors are considered the gold standard in gene therapy.

== Use in gene therapy ==
=== Advantages and drawbacks ===
Wild-type AAV has attracted considerable interest from gene therapy researchers due to a number of features. Chief amongst these was the virus's apparent lack of pathogenicity. It can also infect non-dividing cells and has the ability to stably integrate into the host cell genome at a specific site (designated AAVS1) in the human chromosome 19. This feature makes it somewhat more predictable than retroviruses, which present the threat of a random insertion and of mutagenesis, which is sometimes followed by development of a cancer. The AAV genome integrates most frequently into the site mentioned, while random incorporations into the genome take place with a negligible frequency. Development of AAVs as gene therapy vectors, however, has eliminated this integrative capacity by removal of the rep and cap from the DNA of the vector. The desired gene together with a promoter to drive transcription of the gene is inserted between the inverted terminal repeats (ITRs) that aid in concatemer formation in the nucleus after the single-stranded vector DNA is converted by host cell DNA polymerase complexes into double-stranded DNA. AAV-based gene therapy vectors form episomal concatemers in the host cell nucleus. In non-dividing cells, these concatemers remain intact for the life of the host cell. In dividing cells, AAV DNA is lost through cell division, since the episomal DNA is not replicated along with the host cell DNA. Concatemerization of AAV DNA has been proposed to aid in expression, but may also lead to aberrant expression due to crasstalk between concatermerized AAV genomes. Random integration of AAV DNA into the host genome is detectable but occurs at very low frequency. AAVs also present very low immunogenicity, seemingly restricted to generation of neutralizing antibodies, while they induce no clearly defined cytotoxic response. This feature, along with the ability to infect quiescent cells present their dominance over adenoviruses as vectors for human gene therapy.

The primary method for AAV production involves transient transfection of HEK-293 cells using three plasmids that carry the therapeutic gene, AAV rep/cap genes, and helper adenoviral genes. The production process includes cultivation, particularly in bioreactors, and purification aimed at increasing the yield of full capsids and removing impurities. To improve productivity, new methods are being developed, such as using engineered recombinant helper viruses and establishing stable producer cell lines.

Use of the virus does present some disadvantages. The cloning capacity of the vector is relatively limited and most therapeutic genes require the complete replacement of the virus's 4.8 kilobase genome. Large genes are, therefore, not suitable for use in a standard AAV vector. Options are currently being explored to overcome the limited coding capacity:

- The AAV ITRs of two genomes can anneal to form head-to-tail concatemers, almost doubling the capacity of the vector. Insertion of splice sites allows for the removal of the ITRs from the transcript.
- CRISPR allows the use of sequential insertion at any desired site. The first vector recognizes the target locus and inserts half of the desired gene. The second vector then recognizes the half-done insertion and inserts the other half.

Because of AAV's specialized gene therapy advantages, researchers have created an altered version of AAV termed self-complementary adeno-associated virus (scAAV). Whereas AAV packages a single strand of DNA and must wait for its second strand to be synthesized, scAAV packages two shorter strands that are complementary to each other. By avoiding second-strand synthesis, scAAV can express more quickly, although as a caveat, scAAV can only encode half of the already limited capacity of AAV. Recent reports suggest that scAAV vectors are more immunogenic than single stranded adenovirus vectors, inducing a stronger activation of cytotoxic T lymphocytes.

Humoral immunity instigated by infection with the wild type is thought to be common. The associated neutralising activity limits the usefulness of the most commonly used serotype AAV2 in certain applications. Accordingly, the majority of clinical trials under way involve delivery of AAV2 into the brain, a relatively immunologically privileged organ. In the brain, AAV2 is strongly neuron-specific.

=== Clinical trials ===
As of 2019, AAV vectors have been used in over 250 clinical trials worldwide, approximately 8.3% of virus-vectored gene-therapy trials. Recently, promising results have been obtained from Phase 1 and Phase 2 trials for a number of diseases, including Leber's congenital amaurosis, hemophilia, congestive heart failure, spinal muscular atrophy, lipoprotein lipase deficiency, and Parkinson's disease.

Selected clinical trials using AAV-based vectors
Indication	Gene	Route of administration	Phase	Subject number	Status
Cystic fibrosis	CFTR	Lung, via aerosol	I	12	Complete
Cystic fibrosis	CFTR	Lung, via aerosol	II	38	Complete
Cystic fibrosis	CFTR	Lung, via aerosol	II	100	Complete
Hemophilia B	FIX	Intramuscular	I	9	Complete
Hemophilia B	FIX	Hepatic artery	I	6	Ended
Arthritis	TNFR:Fc	Intraarticular	I	1	Ongoing
Hereditary emphysema	AAT	Intramuscular	I	12	Ongoing
Leber's congenital amaurosis	RPE65	Subretinal	I–II	Multiple	Several ongoing and complete (voretigene neparvovec)
Age-related macular degeneration	sFlt-1	Subretinal	I–II	24	Ongoing
Duchenne muscular dystrophy	SGCA	Intramuscular	I	10	Ongoing
Parkinson's disease	GAD65, GAD67	Intracranial	I	12	Complete
Canavan disease	AAC	Intracranial	I	21	Ongoing
Batten disease	CLN2	Intracranial	I	10	Ongoing
Alzheimer's disease	NGF	Intracranial	I	6	Ongoing
Spinal muscular atrophy	SMN1	Intravenous, intrathecal	I–III	150+	Several ongoing and complete (onasemnogene abeparvovec)
Congestive heart failure	SERCA2a	Intra-coronary	IIb	250	Ongoing

=== FDA Approved AAV Gene Therapy Products ===
AAV based gene therapy products have entered the worldwide market following completion of successful clinical trials. The table below contains FDA approved gene therapies that have entered the American Market and possibly other markets.

AAV Based FDA-Approved Gene Therapy
Drug Name	Indication	Date of FDA Approval Announcement	Company Marketing
LUXTURNA	RPE65 Mutation-associated retinal dystrophy	19 December 2017	Spark Therapeutcs
HEMGENIX	Hemophilia B	22 November 2022	CSL Behring
ROCTAVIAN	Hemophilia A	30 June 2023	BioMarin Pharmaceutical
BEQVEZ	Hemophilia B	25 April 2024	Pfizer
ELEVIDYS	Duchenne Muscular Dystrophy (DMD)	Either 20 June or 29 August 2024	Sarepta Therapeutics
ZOLGENSMA	Spinal Muscular Atrophy (SMA)	26 July 2024	Novartis Gene Therapies
KEBILIDI	Aromatic L Amino-Acid Decarboxylase (AADC) Deficiency	11 November 2024	PTC Therapeutics
ITVISMA	Spinal Muscular Atrophy (SMA)	24 November 2025	Novartis Gene Therapies
OTARMENI	Biallelic OTOF mutation associated Sensorineural hearing loss	23 April 2026	Regeneron Pharmaceuticals
GENGLYCOS	Glycogen Storage Disease Type Ia	19 August 2026	Ultragenyx
FAYUVI	Sanfilippo Syndrome Type A	17 September 2026	Ultragenyx

== Fundamental biology ==
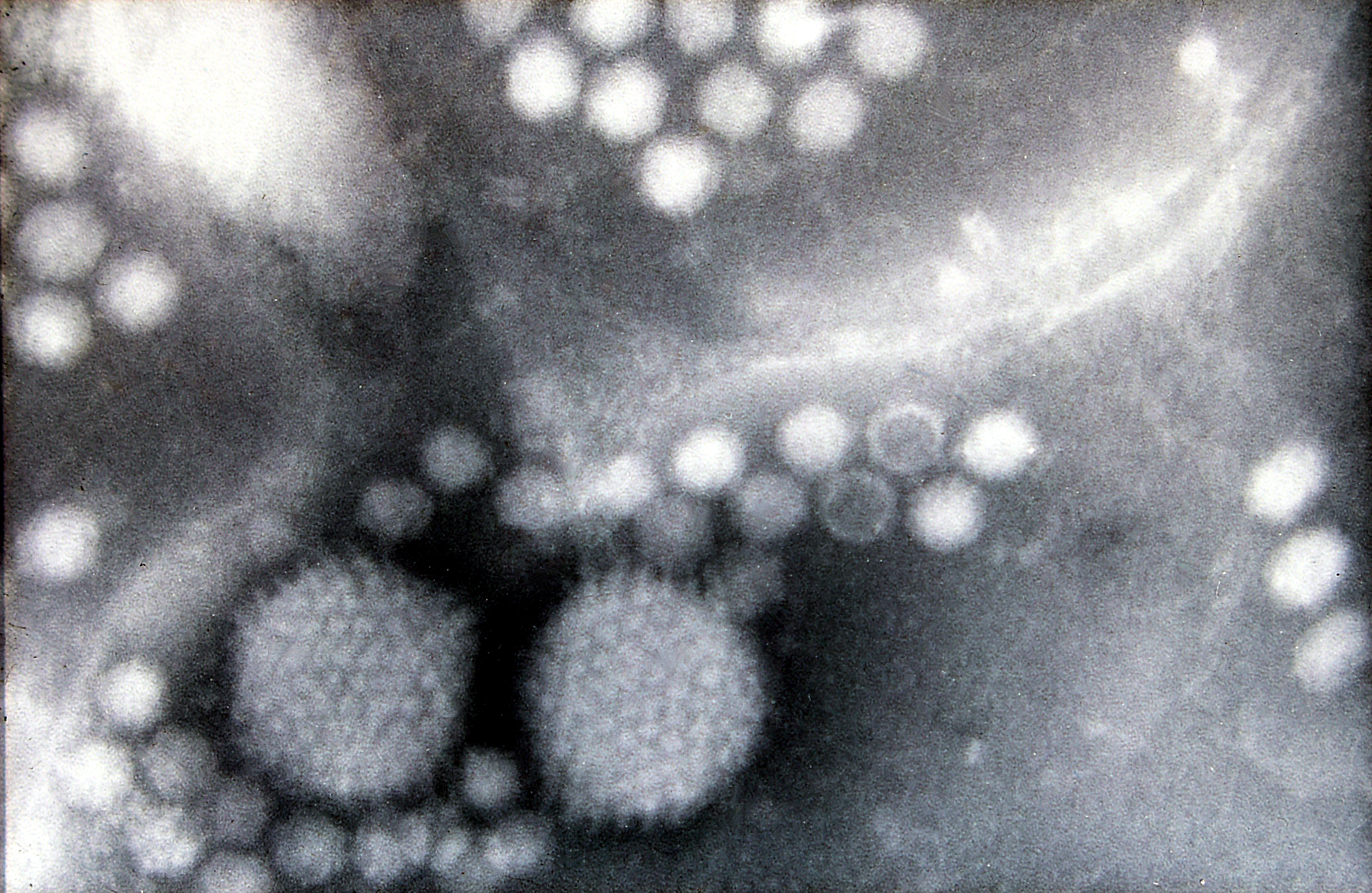
Two adenovirus particles surrounded by numerous, smaller adeno-associated viruses (negative-staining electron microscopy, magnification approximately 200,000×)

=== Genomics, transcriptomics and proteomics ===
The AAV genome is built of single-stranded deoxyribonucleic acid (ssDNA), either positive- or negative-sensed, which is about 4.7 kilobase long. The genome comprises ITRs at both ends of the DNA strand, and two open reading frames (ORFs): rep and cap. The former is composed of four overlapping genes encoding Rep proteins required for the AAV life cycle, and the latter contains overlapping nucleotide sequences of capsid proteins: VP1, VP2 and VP3, which interact to form a capsid with icosahedral symmetry.

==== ITR sequences ====
The inverted terminal repeat (ITR) sequences comprise 145 bases each. They were named so because of their symmetry, which was shown to be required for efficient multiplication of the AAV genome. The feature of these sequences that gives them this property is their ability to form a hairpin, which contributes to so-called self-priming that allows primase-independent synthesis of the second DNA strand. The ITRs were also shown to be required for both integration of the AAV DNA into the host cell genome (19th chromosome in humans) and rescue from it, as well as for efficient encapsidation of the AAV DNA combined with generation of a fully assembled, deoxyribonuclease-resistant AAV particles.

With regard to gene therapy, ITRs seem to be the only sequences required in cis next to the therapeutic gene: structural (cap) and packaging (rep) proteins can be delivered in trans. With this assumption many methods were established for efficient production of recombinant AAV (rAAV) vectors containing a reporter or therapeutic gene. However, it was also published that the ITRs are not the only elements required in cis for the effective replication and encapsidation. A few research groups have identified a sequence designated cis-acting Rep-dependent element (CARE) inside the coding sequence of the rep gene. CARE was shown to augment the replication and encapsidation when present in cis.

==== rep gene and Rep proteins ====
On the "left side" of the genome there are two promoters called p5 and p19, from which two overlapping messenger ribonucleic acids (mRNAs) of different length can be produced. Each of these contains an intron which can be either spliced out or not. Given these possibilities, four various mRNAs, and consequently four various Rep proteins with overlapping sequence can be synthesized. Their names depict their sizes in kilodaltons (kDa): Rep78, Rep68, Rep52 and Rep40. Rep78 and 68 can specifically bind the hairpin formed by the ITR in the self-priming act and cleave at a specific region, designated terminal resolution site, within the hairpin. They were also shown to be necessary for the AAVS1-specific integration of the AAV genome. All four Rep proteins were shown to bind ATP and to possess helicase activity. It was also shown that they upregulate the transcription from the p40 promoter (mentioned below), but downregulate both p5 and p19 promoters.

==== cap gene and VP proteins ====
The right side of a positive-sensed AAV genome encodes overlapping sequences of three capsid proteins, VP1, VP2 and VP3, and two accessory proteins, MAAP & AAP, which start from one promoter, designated p40. The molecular weights of these proteins are 87, 72 and 62 kiloDaltons, respectively. The AAV capsid is composed of a mixture of VP1, VP2, and VP3 totaling 60 monomers arranged in icosahedral symmetry in a ratio of 1:1:10, with an empty mass of approximately 3.8 MDa. The crystal structure of the VP3 protein was determined by Xie, Bue, et al.

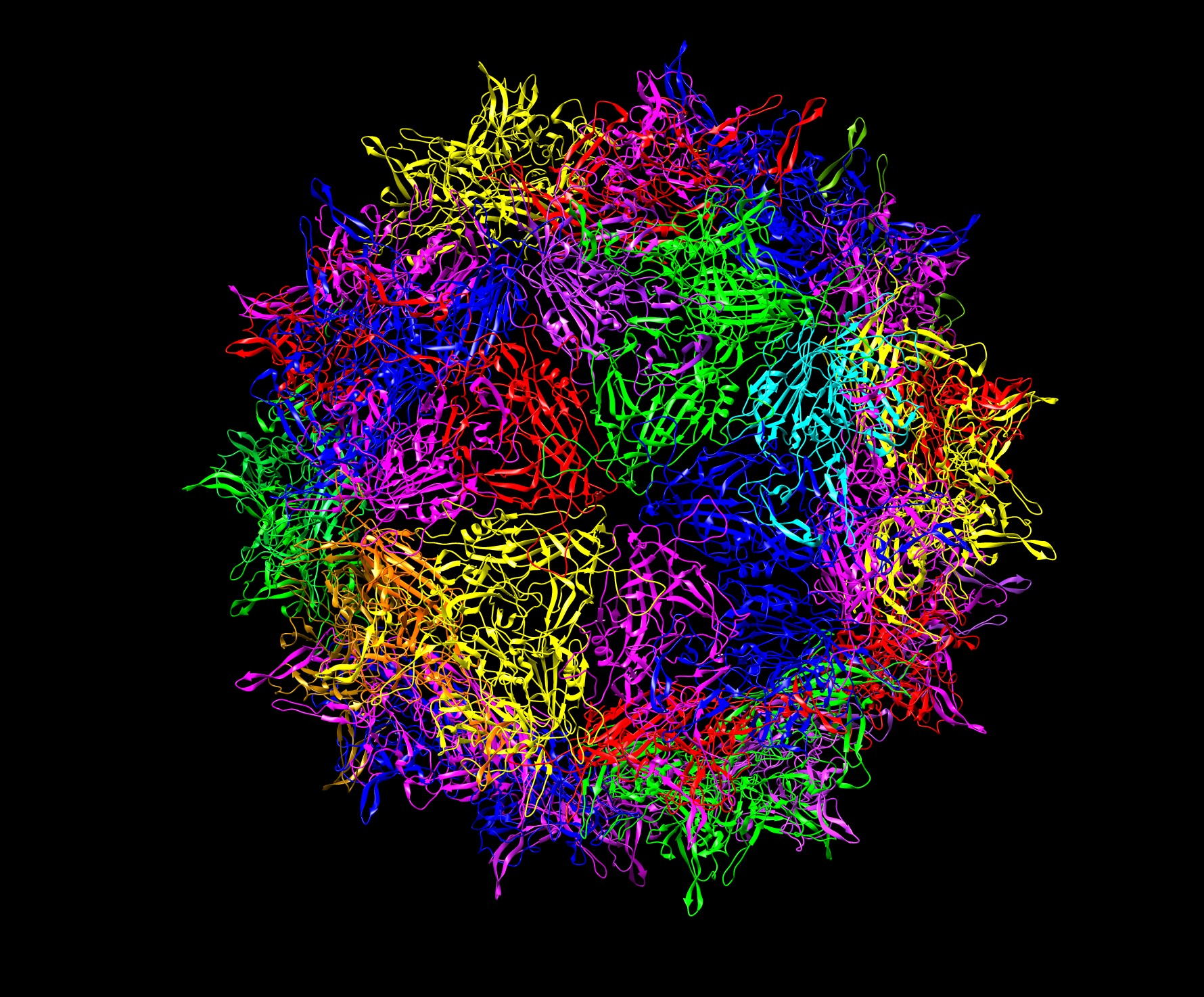
AAV2 capsid, shown as a ribbon diagram, with the back half hidden for clarity. One fivefold symmetry axis is shown center.

The cap gene produces an additional, non-structural protein called the Assembly-Activating Protein (AAP). This protein is produced from ORF2 and is essential for the capsid-assembly process. The exact function of this protein in the assembly process and its structure have not been solved to date.

All three VPs are translated from one mRNA. After this mRNA is synthesized, it can be spliced in two different manners: either a longer or shorter intron can be excised resulting in the formation of two pools of mRNAs: a 2.3 kb- and a 2.6 kb-long mRNA pool. Usually, especially in the presence of adenovirus, the longer intron is preferred, so the 2.3-kb-long mRNA represents the so-called "major splice". In this form the first AUG codon, from which the synthesis of VP1 protein starts, is cut out, resulting in a reduced overall level of VP1 protein synthesis. The first AUG codon that remains in the major splice is the initiation codon for VP3 protein. However, upstream of that codon in the same open reading frame lies an ACG sequence (encoding threonine) which is surrounded by an optimal Kozak context. This contributes to a low level of synthesis of VP2 protein, which is actually VP3 protein with additional N terminal residues, as is VP1.

Since the bigger intron is preferred to be spliced out, and since in the major splice the ACG codon is a much weaker translation initiation signal, the ratio at which the AAV structural proteins are synthesized in vivo is about 1:1:20, which is the same as in the mature virus particle. The unique fragment at the N terminus of VP1 protein was shown to possess the phospholipase A2 (PLA2) activity, which is probably required for the releasing of AAV particles from late endosomes. Muralidhar et al. reported that VP2 and VP3 are crucial for correct virion assembly. More recently, however, Warrington et al. showed VP2 to be unnecessary for the complete virus particle formation and an efficient infectivity, and also presented that VP2 can tolerate large insertions in its N terminus, while VP1 can not, probably because of the PLA2 domain presence.

==== Post-translational modifications ====
Recent discoveries made through use of high-throughput 'omics approaches include the fact that AAV capsids are post-translationally modified (PTM) during production such as acetylation, methylation, phosphorylation, deamidation, O-GlycNAcylation and SUMOylation throughout capsid proteins VP1, VP2 and VP3. These PTMs differ depending on the manufacturing production platform. Another such discovery is the fact that AAV genomes are epigenetically methylated during production. Besides price, these findings might affect expression kinetics, rAAV receptor binding, trafficking, vector immunogenicity, and expression durability.

== Classification, serotypes, receptors and native tropism ==
in humans
Serotype	Tissue tropism	Pass the blood brain barrier	Cell tropism	Synthetic	Comment	Published cap / rep
2	smooth muscle, CNS, liver	No		No		
5	CNS, smooth muscle	No		No		
8	CNS, Brain, Liver, smooth muscle	No		No		
9	CNS, liver, smooth muscle	Yes		No		
PAL2	CNS	Yes		Yes	Liver expression is 1/4 of AAV9	No
9P1/AAVMYO	CNS	Yes	astrocytes	Yes	high musculature including skeletal muscle, heart and diaphragmsckeletal transduction	No

Two species of AAV were recognised by the International Committee on Taxonomy of Viruses in 2013: adeno-associated dependoparvovirus A (formerly AAV-1, −2, −3 and −4) and adeno-associated dependoparvovirus B (formerly AAV-5).

Until the 1990s, virtually all AAV biology was studied using AAV serotype 2. However, AAV is highly prevalent in humans and other primates and several serotypes have been isolated from various tissue samples. Serotypes 2, 3, 5, and 6 were discovered in human cells, AAV serotypes 1, 4, and 7–11 in nonhuman primate samples. As of 2006 there have been 11 AAV serotypes described, the 11th in 2004. AAV capsid proteins contain 12 hypervariable surface regions, with most variability occurring in the threefold proximal peaks, but the parvovirus genome in general presents highly conserved replication and structural genes across serotypes. All of the known serotypes can infect cells from multiple diverse tissue types.

=== Serotype 2 ===
Serotype 2 (AAV2) has been the most extensively examined so far. AAV2 presents natural tropism towards skeletal muscles, neurons, vascular smooth muscle cells and hepatocytes.

Three cell receptors have been described for AAV2: heparan sulfate proteoglycan (HSPG), a_{V}β_{5} integrin and fibroblast growth factor receptor 1 (FGFR-1). The first functions as a primary receptor, while the latter two have a co-receptor activity and enable AAV to enter the cell by receptor-mediated endocytosis. These study results have been disputed by Qiu, Handa, et al. HSPG functions as the primary receptor, though its abundance in the extracellular matrix can scavenge AAV particles and impair the infection efficiency.

Studies have shown that serotype 2 of the virus (AAV-2) apparently kills cancer cells without harming healthy ones. "Our results suggest that adeno-associated virus type 2, which infects the majority of the population but has no known ill effects, kills multiple types of cancer cells yet has no effect on healthy cells," said Craig Meyers, a professor of immunology and microbiology at the Penn State College of Medicine in Pennsylvania in 2005. This could lead to a new anti-cancer agent.

In March 2023, a series of Nature papers linked infection of adeno-associated virus 2 (AAV2) to a wave of childhood hepatitis.

=== Other serotypes ===
Although AAV2 is the most popular serotype in various AAV-based research, it has been shown that other serotypes can be more effective as gene delivery vectors. AAV9 passes the blood-brain-barrier in humans, AAV6 appears much better in infecting airway epithelial cells, AAV7 presents very high transduction rate of murine skeletal muscle cells (similar to AAV1 and AAV5), AAV8 transduce hepatocytes and AAV1 and 5 were shown to be very efficient in gene delivery to vascular endothelial cells. In the brain, most AAV serotypes show neuronal tropism, while AAV5 also transduces astrocytes. AAV6, a hybrid of AAV1 and AAV2, also shows lower immunogenicity than AAV2.

Serotypes can differ with the respect to the receptors they are bound to. For example, AAV4 and AAV5 transduction can be inhibited by soluble sialic acids (of different form for each of these serotypes), and AAV5 was shown to enter cells via the platelet-derived growth factor receptor.

==== Synthetic serotypes ====
There have been many efforts to engineer and improve new AAV variants for both clinical and research purposes. Such modifications include new tropisms to target specific tissues, and modified surface residues to evade detection by the immune system. Beyond opting for particular strains of recombinant AAV (rAAV) to target particular cells, researchers have also explored AAV pseudotyping, the practice of creating hybrids of certain AAV strains to approach an even more refined target. The hybrid is created by taking a capsid from one strain and the genome from another strain. For example:

- Mixing AAV2 and AAV5, then undergoing directed evolution, can produce a virus that targets the respiratory tract.
- AAV2/5, a hybrid with the genome of AAV2 and the capsid of AAV5, was able to achieve more accuracy and range in brain cells than AAV2 would be able to achieve unhybridized. Researchers have continued to experiment with pseudotyping by creating strains with hybrid capsids.
- AAV-DJ has a hybrid capsid from eight different strains of AAV; as such, it can infect different cells throughout many areas of the body, a property which a single strain of AAV with a limited tropism would not have.

Other efforts to engineer and improve new AAV variants have involved the ancestral reconstruction of virus variants to generate new vectors with enhanced properties for clinical applications and the study of AAV biology. Tags may be inserted into the AAV capsid to allow coupling of binders and improve targeting to specific cell-types or tissues.

== Immunology ==
AAV is of particular interest to gene therapists due to its apparent limited capacity to induce immune responses in humans, a factor which should positively influence vector transduction efficiency while reducing the risk of any immune-associated pathology.

AAV is not considered to have any known role in disease. However, host immune system response and immune tolerance reduce the efficacy of AAV-mediated gene therapy. Host immune response has been shown to respond to the AAV vectors, the transduced cells, and the transduced proteins. The immune response can be subdivided into two categories: innate and adaptive, the latter of which is divided into humoral and cell-mediated.

=== Innate ===
The innate immune response to the AAV vectors has been characterised in animal models. Intravenous administration in mice causes transient production of pro-inflammatory cytokines and some infiltration of neutrophils and other leukocytes into the liver, which seems to sequester a large percentage of the injected viral particles. Both soluble factor levels and cell infiltration appear to return to baseline within six hours. By contrast, more aggressive viruses produce innate responses lasting 24 hours or longer.

In-vivo studies indicate that AAV vectors interact with the Toll-like receptor (TLR)9- and TLR2-MyD88 pathways to trigger the innate immune response by stimulating the production of interferons. It's shown that mice deficient in TLR9 are more receptive to AAV treatment and demonstrate higher levels of transgene expression

=== Humoral ===
Due to previous natural infection, many people have preexisting neutralizing antibodies (NAbs) against AAV's, which can significantly hinder its application in gene therapy. Even though AAV's are highly variable among wild-type and synthetic variants, antibody recognition sites may be conserved evolutionarily.

The virus is known to instigate robust humoral immunity in animal models and in the human population, where up to 80% of individuals are thought to be seropositive for AAV2. Antibodies are known to be neutralising, and for gene therapy applications these do impact vector transduction efficiency via some routes of administration. As well as persistent AAV specific antibody levels, it appears from both prime-boost studies in animals and from clinical trials that the B-cell memory is also strong. In seropositive humans, circulating IgG antibodies for AAV2 appear to be primarily composed of the IgG1 and IgG2 subclasses, with little or no IgG3 or IgG4 present.

=== Cell-mediated ===
The cell-mediated response to the virus and to vectors is poorly characterised, and has been largely ignored in the literature as recently as 2005. Clinical trials using an AAV2-based vector to treat haemophilia B seem to indicate that targeted destruction of transduced cells may be occurring. Combined with data that shows that CD8+ T-cells can recognise elements of the AAV capsid in vitro, it appears that there may be a cytotoxic T lymphocyte response to AAV vectors. Cytotoxic responses would imply the involvement of CD4+ T helper cells in the response to AAV and in vitro data from human studies suggests that the virus may indeed induce such responses, including both Th1 and Th2 memory responses. A number of candidate T cell stimulating epitopes have been identified within the AAV capsid protein VP1, which may be attractive targets for modification of the capsid if the virus is to be used as a vector for gene therapy.

== Infection cycle ==
There are several steps in the AAV infection cycle, from infecting a cell to producing new infectious particles:

1. attachment to the cell membrane
2. receptor-mediated endocytosis
3. endosomal trafficking
4. escape from the late endosome or lysosome
5. translocation to the nucleus
6. uncoating
7. formation of double-stranded DNA replicative form of the AAV genome
8. expression of rep genes
9. genome replication
10. expression of cap genes, synthesis of progeny ssDNA particles
11. assembly of complete virions, and
12. release from the infected cell.

Some of these steps may look different in various types of cells, which, in part, contributes to the defined and quite limited native tropism of AAV. Replication of the virus can also vary in one cell type, depending on the cell's current cell cycle phase.

The characteristic feature of the adeno-associated virus is a deficiency in replication and thus its inability to multiply in unaffected cells. Adeno-associated virus spreads by co-infecting a cell with a helper virus. The first helper virus that was described as providing successful generation of new AAV particles, was the adenovirus, from which the AAV name originated. It was then shown that AAV replication can be facilitated by selected proteins derived from the adenovirus genome, by other viruses such as HSV or vaccinia, or by genotoxic agents, such as UV irradiation or hydroxyurea. Depending on the presence or absence of a helper virus, the life cycle of AAV follows either a lytic or lysogenic pathway, respectively. If there is a helper virus, AAV's gene expression activates, allowing the virus to replicate using the host cell's polymerase. When the helper virus kills the host cell, the new AAV virions are released. If there is not a helper virus present, AAV exhibits lysogenic behavior. When AAV infects a cell alone, its gene expression is repressed (AAV does not replicate), and its genome is incorporated into the host genome (into human chromosome 19). In rare cases, lysis can occur without a helper virus, but usually AAV cannot replicate and kill a cell on its own.

The minimal set of the adenoviral genes required for efficient generation, of progeny AAV particles, was discovered by Matsushita, Ellinger et al. This discovery allowed for new production methods of recombinant AAV, which do not require adenoviral co-infection of the AAV-producing cells. In the absence of helper virus or genotoxic factors, AAV DNA can either integrate into the host genome or persist in episomal form. In the former case integration is mediated by Rep78 and Rep68 proteins and requires the presence of ITRs flanking the region being integrated. In mice, the AAV genome has been observed persisting for long periods of time in quiescent tissues, such as skeletal muscles, in episomal form (a circular head-to-tail conformation).

== See also ==
- Isogenic human disease models
- Oncolytic AAV
- Recombinant AAV mediated genome engineering
