= Recombinant AAV mediated genome engineering =

Recombinant adeno-associated virus (rAAV) based genome engineering is a genome editing platform centered on the use of recombinant AAV vectors that enables insertion, deletion or substitution of DNA sequences into the genomes of live mammalian cells. The technique builds on Mario Capecchi and Oliver Smithies' Nobel Prize–winning discovery that homologous recombination (HR), a natural hi-fidelity DNA repair mechanism, can be harnessed to perform precise genome alterations in mice. rAAV mediated genome-editing improves the efficiency of this technique to permit genome engineering in any pre-established and differentiated human cell line, which, in contrast to mouse ES cells, have low rates of HR.

The technique has been widely adopted for use in engineering human cell lines to generate isogenic human disease models. It has also been used to optimize bioproducer cell lines for the biomanufacturing of protein vaccines and therapeutics. In addition, due to the non-pathogenic nature of rAAV, it has emerged as a desirable vector for performing gene therapy in live patients.

== rAAV Vector ==
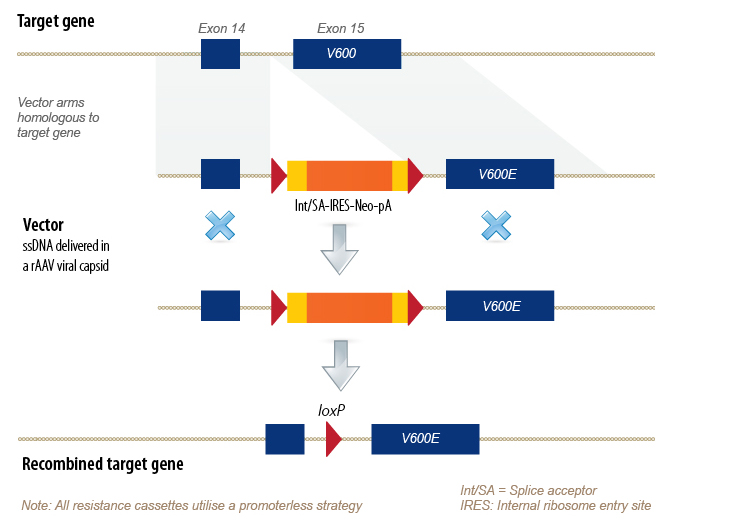
Diagram of a typical rAAV vector

The rAAV genome is built of single-stranded deoxyribonucleic acid (ssDNA), either positive- or negative-sensed, which is about 4.7 kilobases long. These single-stranded DNA viral vectors have high transduction rates and have a unique property of stimulating endogenous HR without causing double strand DNA breaks in the genome, which is typical of other homing endonuclease mediated genome editing methods.

== Capabilities ==
Users can design a rAAV vector to any target genomic locus and perform both gross and subtle endogenous gene alterations in mammalian somatic cell-types. These include gene knock-outs for functional genomics, or the 'knock-in' of protein tag insertions to track translocation events at physiological levels in live cells. Most importantly, rAAV targets a single allele at a time and does not result in any off-target genomic alterations. Because of this, it is able to routinely and accurately model genetic diseases caused by subtle SNPs or point mutations that are increasingly the targets of novel drug discovery programs.

== Applications ==
To date, the use of rAAV mediated genome engineering has been published in over 2100 peer reviewed scientific journals. Another emerging application of rAAV based genome editing is for gene therapy in patients, due to the accuracy and lack of off-target recombination events afforded by the approach.

== See also ==
- Biological engineering
- Genome engineering
- Homing endonuclease
- Homologous recombination
- Meganuclease
- Zinc finger nuclease
- Isogenic human disease models
- Cas9

== Sources ==
- Bardelli A, Parsons DW, Silliman N, et al. (May 2003). "Mutational analysis of the tyrosine kinome in colorectal cancers". Science. 300 (5621): 949. doi:10.1126/science.1082596. PMID 12738854. S2CID 85934154.
- Kohli M, Rago C, Lengauer C, Kinzler KW, Vogelstein B (2004). "Facile methods for generating human somatic cell gene knockouts using recombinant adeno-associated viruses". Nucleic Acids Res. 32 (1): 3e–3. doi:10.1093/nar/gnh009. PMC 373311. PMID 14704360.
- Wang Z, Shen D, Parsons DW, et al. (May 2004). "Mutational analysis of the tyrosine phosphatome in colorectal cancers". Science. 304 (5674): 1164–6. Bibcode:2004Sci...304.1164W. doi:10.1126/science.1096096. PMID 15155950. S2CID 2974833.
- Dhanushkodi A, Akano EO, Roguski EE, Xue Y, Rao SK, Matta SG, Rex, TS, & McDonald MP (2013). "A single intramuscular injection of rAAV-mediated mutant erythropoietin protects against MPTP-induced parkinsonism". Genes, Brain and Behavior. 12 (2): 224–233. doi:10.1111/gbb.12001. PMC 4360975. PMID 23190369.
- Topaloglu O, Hurley PJ, Yildirim O, Civin CI, Bunz F (2005). "Improved methods for the generation of human gene knockout and knockin cell lines". Nucleic Acids Res. 33 (18): e158. doi:10.1093/nar/gni160. PMC 1255732. PMID 16214806.
- Moroni M, Sartore-Bianchi A, Benvenuti S, Artale S, Bardelli A, Siena S (November 2005). "Somatic mutation of EGFR catalytic domain and treatment with gefitinib in colorectal cancer". Ann. Oncol. 16 (11): 1848–9. doi:10.1093/annonc/mdi356. PMID 16012179.
- Di Nicolantonio F, Bardelli A (January 2006). "Kinase mutations in cancer: chinks in the enemy's armour?". Curr Opin Oncol. 18 (1): 69–76. doi:10.1097/01.cco.0000198020.91724.48. PMID 16357567. S2CID 25857889.
- Benvenuti S, Sartore-Bianchi A, Di Nicolantonio F, et al. (March 2007). "Oncogenic activation of the RAS/RAF signaling pathway impairs the response of metastatic colorectal cancers to anti-epidermal growth factor receptor antibody therapies". Cancer Res. 67 (6): 2643–8. doi:10.1158/0008-5472.CAN-06-4158. PMID 17363584.
- Arena S, Pisacane A, Mazzone M, Comoglio PM, Bardelli A (July 2007). "Genetic targeting of the kinase activity of the Met receptor in cancer cells". Proc. Natl. Acad. Sci. U.S.A. 104 (27): 11412–7. Bibcode:2007PNAS..10411412A. doi:10.1073/pnas.0703205104. PMC 2040912. PMID 17595299.
- Konishi H, Karakas B, Abukhdeir AM, et al. (September 2007). "Knock-in of mutant K-ras in nontumorigenic human epithelial cells as a new model for studying K-ras mediated transformation". Cancer Res. 67 (18): 8460–7. doi:10.1158/0008-5472.CAN-07-0108. PMID 17875684.
- Arena S, Isella C, Martini M, de Marco A, Medico E, Bardelli A (September 2007). "Knock-in of oncogenic Kras does not transform mouse somatic cells but triggers a transcriptional response that classifies human cancers". Cancer Res. 67 (18): 8468–76. doi:10.1158/0008-5472.CAN-07-1126. PMID 17875685.
- Grim JE, Gustafson MP, Hirata RK, et al. (June 2008). "Isoform- and cell cycle-dependent substrate degradation by the Fbw7 ubiquitin ligase". J. Cell Biol. 181 (6): 913–20. doi:10.1083/jcb.200802076. PMC 2426948. PMID 18559665.
- Fattah FJ, Lichter NF, Fattah KR, Oh S, Hendrickson EA (June 2008). "Ku70, an essential gene, modulates the frequency of rAAV-mediated gene targeting in human somatic cells". Proc. Natl. Acad. Sci. U.S.A. 105 (25): 8703–8. Bibcode:2008PNAS..105.8703F. doi:10.1073/pnas.0712060105. PMC 2438404. PMID 18562296.
- Di Nicolantonio F, Martini M, Molinari F, et al. (December 2008). "Wild-type BRAF is required for response to panitumumab or cetuximab in metastatic colorectal cancer". J. Clin. Oncol. 26 (35): 5705–12. doi:10.1200/JCO.2008.18.0786. hdl:2434/349662. PMID 19001320.
- Di Nicolantonio F, Arena S, Gallicchio M, et al. (December 2008). "Replacement of normal with mutant alleles in the genome of normal human cells unveils mutation-specific drug responses". Proc. Natl. Acad. Sci. U.S.A. 105 (52): 20864–9. Bibcode:2008PNAS..10520864D. doi:10.1073/pnas.0808757105. PMC 2634925. PMID 19106301.
- Gustin JP, Karakas B, Weiss MB, et al. (February 2009). "Knockin of mutant PIK3CA activates multiple oncogenic pathways". Proc. Natl. Acad. Sci. U.S.A. 106 (8): 2835–40. Bibcode:2009PNAS..106.2835G. doi:10.1073/pnas.0813351106. PMC 2636736. PMID 19196980.
- Sartore-Bianchi A, Martini M, Molinari F, et al. (March 2009). "PIK3CA mutations in colorectal cancer are associated with clinical resistance to EGFR-targeted monoclonal antibodies". Cancer Res. 69 (5): 1851–7. doi:10.1158/0008-5472.CAN-08-2466. PMID 19223544.
- Sur S, Pagliarini R, Bunz F, et al. (March 2009). "A panel of isogenic human cancer cells suggests a therapeutic approach for cancers with inactivated p53". Proc. Natl. Acad. Sci. U.S.A. 106 (10): 3964–9. Bibcode:2009PNAS..106.3964S. doi:10.1073/pnas.0813333106. PMC 2656188. PMID 19225112.
- Yun J, Rago C, Cheong I, et al. (September 2009). "Glucose deprivation contributes to the development of KRAS pathway mutations in tumor cells". Science. 325 (5947): 1555–9. Bibcode:2009Sci...325.1555Y. doi:10.1126/science.1174229. PMC 2820374. PMID 19661383.
- Sartore-Bianchi A, Di Nicolantonio F, Nichelatti M, et al. (2009). "Multi-determinants analysis of molecular alterations for predicting clinical benefit to EGFR-targeted monoclonal antibodies in colorectal cancer". PLOS ONE. 4 (10) e7287. Bibcode:2009PLoSO...4.7287S. doi:10.1371/journal.pone.0007287. PMC 2750753. PMID 19806185.
- Endogenous Expression of Oncogenic PI3K Mutation Leads to Activated PI3K Signaling and an Invasive Phenotype Poster Presented at AACR/EORTC Molecular Targets and Cancer Therapeutics, Boston, USA, Nov. 2009
- Bardelli A, Siena S (March 2010). "Molecular mechanisms of resistance to cetuximab and panitumumab in colorectal cancer". J. Clin. Oncol. 28 (7): 1254–61. doi:10.1200/JCO.2009.24.6116. PMID 20100961.
- Fattah F, Lee EH, Weisensel N, Wang Y, Lichter N, Hendrickson EA (February 2010). "Ku regulates the non-homologous end joining pathway choice of DNA double-strand break repair in human somatic cells". PLOS Genet. 6 (2) e1000855. doi:10.1371/journal.pgen.1000855. PMC 2829059. PMID 20195511.
- Buron N, Porceddu M, Brabant M, et al. (2010). "Use of human cancer cell lines mitochondria to explore the mechanisms of BH3 peptides and ABT-737-induced mitochondrial membrane permeabilization". PLOS ONE. 5 (3) e9924. Bibcode:2010PLoSO...5.9924B. doi:10.1371/journal.pone.0009924. PMC 2847598. PMID 20360986.
- Endogenous Expression of Oncogenic PI3K Mutation Leads to accumulation of anti-apoptotic proteins in mitochondria Poster Presented at AACR 2010, Washington, D.C., USA, April. 2010
- The use of 'X-MAN' isogenic cell lines to define PI3-kinase inhibitor activity profiles Poster Presented at AACR 2010, Washington, D.C., USA, April. 2010
- The use of 'X-MAN' mutant PI3CA increases the expression of individual tubulin isoforms and promoted resistance to anti-mitotic chemotherapy drugs Poster Presented at AACR 2010, Washington, D.C., USA, April. 2010
- Di Nicolantonio F, Arena S, Tabernero J, et al. (August 2010). "Deregulation of the PI3K and KRAS signaling pathways in human cancer cells determines their response to everolimus". J. Clin. Invest. 120 (8): 2858–66. doi:10.1172/JCI37539. PMC 2912177. PMID 20664172.
- Kim YG, Cha J, Chandrasegaran S (February 1996). "Hybrid restriction enzymes: zinc finger fusions to Fok I cleavage domain". Proc. Natl. Acad. Sci. U.S.A. 93 (3): 1156–60. Bibcode:1996PNAS...93.1156K. doi:10.1073/pnas.93.3.1156. PMC 40048. PMID 8577732.
- Bitinaite J, Wah DA, Aggarwal AK, Schildkraut I (September 1998). "FokI dimerization is required for DNA cleavage". Proc. Natl. Acad. Sci. U.S.A. 95 (18): 10570–5. Bibcode:1998PNAS...9510570B. doi:10.1073/pnas.95.18.10570. PMC 27935. PMID 9724744.
- Cathomen T, Joung JK (July 2008). "Zinc-finger nucleases: the next generation emerges". Mol. Ther. 16 (7): 1200–7. doi:10.1038/mt.2008.114. PMID 18545224.
- Pabo CO, Peisach E, Grant RA (2001). "Design and selection of novel Cys2His2 zinc finger proteins". Annu. Rev. Biochem. 70 (1): 313–40. Bibcode:2001ARBio..70..313P. doi:10.1146/annurev.biochem.70.1.313. PMID 11395410.
- Ramirez CL, Foley JE, Wright DA, et al. (May 2008). "Unexpected failure rates for modular assembly of engineered zinc fingers". Nat. Methods. 5 (5): 374–5. doi:10.1038/nmeth0508-374. PMC 7880305. PMID 18446154.
- Maeder ML, Thibodeau-Beganny S, Osiak A, et al. (July 2008). "Rapid "open-source" engineering of customized zinc-finger nucleases for highly efficient gene modification". Mol. Cell. 31 (2): 294–301. doi:10.1016/j.molcel.2008.06.016. PMC 2535758. PMID 18657511.
- Ochiai H, Fujita K, Suzuki K, et al. (August 2010). "Targeted mutagenesis in the sea urchin embryo using zinc-finger nucleases" (PDF). Genes Cells. 15 (8): 875–85. doi:10.1111/j.1365-2443.2010.01425.x. PMID 20604805.
- Shukla VK, Doyon Y, Miller JC, et al. (May 2009). "Precise genome modification in the crop species Zea mays using zinc-finger nucleases". Nature. 459 (7245): 437–41. Bibcode:2009Natur.459..437S. doi:10.1038/nature07992. PMID 19404259. S2CID 4323298.
- Ekker SC (2008). "Zinc finger-based knockout punches for zebrafish genes". Zebrafish. 5 (2): 121–3. doi:10.1089/zeb.2008.9988. PMC 2849655. PMID 18554175.
- Carroll D (November 2008). "Progress and prospects: zinc-finger nucleases as gene therapy agents". Gene Ther. 15 (22): 1463–8. doi:10.1038/gt.2008.145. PMC 2747807. PMID 18784746.
- Geurts AM, Cost GJ, Freyvert Y, et al. (July 2009). "Knockout rats via embryo microinjection of zinc-finger nucleases". Science. 325 (5939): 433. Bibcode:2009Sci...325..433G. doi:10.1126/science.1172447. PMC 2831805. PMID 19628861.
- Durai S, Mani M, Kandavelou K, Wu J, Porteus MH, Chandrasegaran S (2005). "Zinc finger nucleases: custom-designed molecular scissors for genome engineering of plant and mammalian cells". Nucleic Acids Res. 33 (18): 5978–90. doi:10.1093/nar/gki912. PMC 1270952. PMID 16251401.
- Lee HJ, Kim E, Kim JS (January 2010). "Targeted chromosomal deletions in human cells using zinc finger nucleases". Genome Res. 20 (1): 81–9. doi:10.1101/gr.099747.109. PMC 2798833. PMID 19952142.
- Kandavelou K, Chandrasegaran S (2008). "Plasmids for Gene Therapy". In Lipps, Georg (ed.). Plasmids: Current Research and Future Trends. Caister Academic Press. ISBN 978-1-904455-35-6.
- Gupta A, Meng X, Zhu LJ, Lawson ND, Wolfe SA (January 2011). "Zinc finger protein-dependent and -independent contributions to the in vivo off-target activity of zinc finger nucleases". Nucleic Acids Res. 39 (1): 381–92. doi:10.1093/nar/gkq787. PMC 3017618. PMID 20843781.
- Grizot S, Smith J, Daboussi F, et al. (September 2009). "Efficient targeting of a SCID gene by an engineered single-chain homing endonuclease". Nucleic Acids Res. 37 (16): 5405–19. doi:10.1093/nar/gkp548. PMC 2760784. PMID 19584299.
- Gao H, Smith J, Yang M, et al. (January 2010). "Heritable targeted mutagenesis in maize using a designed endonuclease". Plant J. 61 (1): 176–87. Bibcode:2010PlJ....61..176G. doi:10.1111/j.1365-313X.2009.04041.x. PMID 19811621.
- Christian M, Cermak T, Doyle EL, et al. (October 2010). "Targeting DNA double-strand breaks with TAL effector nucleases". Genetics. 186 (2): 757–61. doi:10.1534/genetics.110.120717. PMC 2942870. PMID 20660643.
- Li T, Huang S, Jiang WZ, et al. (January 2011). "TAL nucleases (TALNs): hybrid proteins composed of TAL effectors and FokI DNA-cleavage domain". Nucleic Acids Res. 39 (1): 359–72. doi:10.1093/nar/gkq704. PMC 3017587. PMID 20699274.
- Moscou MJ, Bogdanove AJ (December 2009). "A simple cipher governs DNA recognition by TAL effectors". Science. 326 (5959): 1501. Bibcode:2009Sci...326.1501M. doi:10.1126/science.1178817. PMID 19933106. S2CID 6648530.
- Boch J, Scholze H, Schornack S, et al. (December 2009). "Breaking the code of DNA binding specificity of TAL-type III effectors". Science. 326 (5959): 1509–12. Bibcode:2009Sci...326.1509B. doi:10.1126/science.1178811. PMID 19933107. S2CID 206522347.
- Stoddard BL (2005). "Homing endonuclease structure and function". Quarterly Reviews of Biophysics. 38 (1): 49–95. Bibcode:2005QRBio..38...49S. doi:10.1017/S0033583505004063. PMID 16336743. S2CID 27841011.
- Seligman LM, Chisholm KM, Chevalier BS, et al. (September 2002). "Mutations altering the cleavage specificity of a homing endonuclease". Nucleic Acids Res. 30 (17): 3870–9. doi:10.1093/nar/gkf495. PMC 137417. PMID 12202772.
- Sussman D, Chadsey M, Fauce S, et al. (September 2004). "Isolation and characterization of new homing endonuclease specificities at individual target site positions". J. Mol. Biol. 342 (1): 31–41. doi:10.1016/j.jmb.2004.07.031. PMID 15313605.
- Rosen LE, Morrison HA, Masri S, et al. (2006). "Homing endonuclease I-CreI derivatives with novel DNA target specificities". Nucleic Acids Res. 34 (17): 4791–800. doi:10.1093/nar/gkl645. PMC 1635285. PMID 16971456.
- Arnould S, Chames P, Perez C, et al. (January 2006). "Engineering of large numbers of highly specific homing endonucleases that induce recombination on novel DNA targets". J. Mol. Biol. 355 (3): 443–58. doi:10.1016/j.jmb.2005.10.065. PMID 16310802.
- Smith J, Grizot S, Arnould S, et al. (2006). "A combinatorial approach to create artificial homing endonucleases cleaving chosen sequences". Nucleic Acids Res. 34 (22): e149. doi:10.1093/nar/gkl720. PMC 1702487. PMID 17130168.
- Chevalier BS, Kortemme T, Chadsey MS, Baker D, Monnat RJ, Stoddard BL (October 2002). "Design, activity, and structure of a highly specific artificial endonuclease". Mol. Cell. 10 (4): 895–905. doi:10.1016/S1097-2765(02)00690-1. PMID 12419232.
- Grizot S, Epinat JC, Thomas S, et al. (April 2010). "Generation of redesigned homing endonucleases comprising DNA-binding domains derived from two different scaffolds". Nucleic Acids Res. 38 (6): 2006–18. doi:10.1093/nar/gkp1171. PMC 2847234. PMID 20026587.
