= Salvatore Siena =

Italian medical oncologist

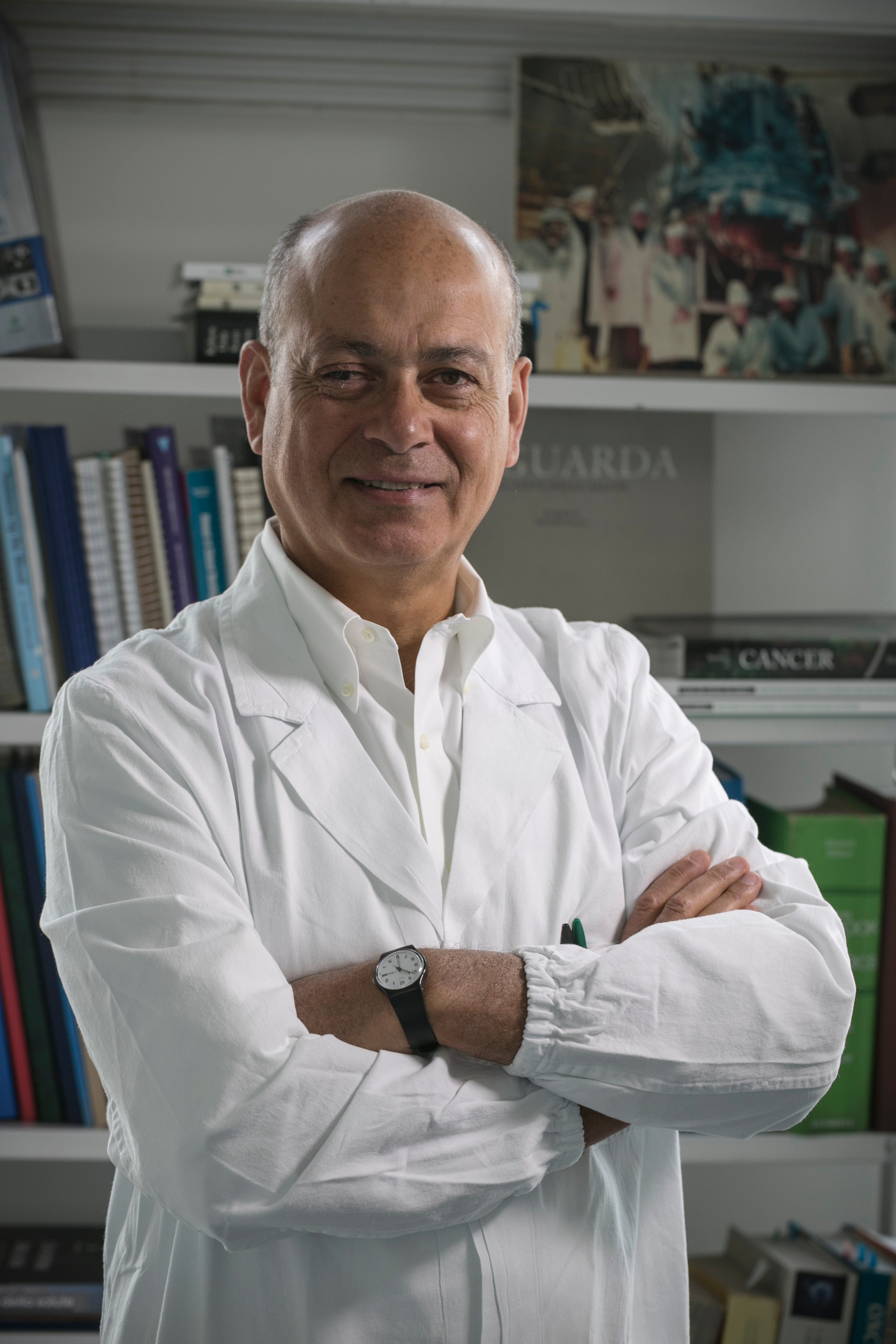

Salvatore Siena is an Italian medical oncologist, full professor of Medical Oncology at University of Milan (La Statale), and Director of the School of Specialization in Medical Oncology. He also serves as Director of Niguarda Cancer Center and Department of Hematology, Oncology, and Molecular Medicine at Ospedale Niguarda in Milan. He is also the head of the Falck Division of Medical Oncology at the same institution. He is active as the President of Fondazione Oncologia Niguarda ETS which operates in the non-profit field.

== Career ==
From 1970 to 1973, Salvatore Siena attended the gymnasium of Francesco Morosini Naval Military School in Venice, Italy, an experience that established the basis for his sense of discipline and civic duty.

He earned his degree in Medicine and Surgery from University of Pavia and pursued post-doctoral training at the Ospedale San Matteo in Pavia, the Memorial Sloan Kettering Cancer Center in New York, and the Fred Hutchinson Cancer Center in Seattle.

From 1984 to 1997, he held key positions at the National Cancer Institute of Milan, and then at the Humanitas Research Hospital from 1997 to 1998. Since 1999, he has been a medical oncologist at Ospedale Niguarda in Milan and full professor of Medical Oncology at University of Milan (La Statale).

Siena specializes in patient care and development of innovative cancer therapies. His research primarily focuses on phase I-II clinical trials targeting epithelial tumors, especially those related to the digestive and respiratory systems. His research is funded by competitive grants from organizations including the European Community, AIRC Foundation (Italian Association for Cancer Research), Fondazione Oncologia Niguarda, Ministry of Health, and Fondazione Regionale Ricerca Biomedica (FRRB) of Regione Lombardia.

=== Contributions to Clinical Practice ===
- Pioneered the mobilization and transplantation of blood stem cells, together with Alessandro Massimo Gianni and Marco Bregni, developing the concept of the most effective dose of CD34+ cells per kilogram of body weight and proposing mobilized CD34+ cells in peripheral blood as a target for gene therapy for the first time.
- Identified the role of RAS and BRAF mutations in EGFR-targeted therapies for metastatic colorectal cancer, together with Alberto Bardelli.
- Developed treatments for colorectal cancer and other malignancies targeting actionable alterations in EGFR, HER2, BRAF, ROS1, NTRK, RET, MET, and ALK.
- Introduced liquid biopsy to guide tailored treatments for colorectal cancer.
- Studied strategies to sensitize colorectal cancers to immunotherapy.

In 2024, the first results of NO-CUT trial - for which he is the main investigator evaluating non-operative management of locally advanced rectal cancer - were presented at the Presidential Symposium 'Eyes to the Future' during the ESMO 2024 Congress, generating significant interest for their impact on clinical practice.

== Awards and recognitions ==
Since 2015, Thomson Reuters/Clarivate Analytics has recognized Salvatore Siena as one of the World's Most Influential Scientific Minds and a Highly Cited Researcher. He is member of technical scientific committees for various medical biotechnology organizations.

In 2020, he received the AIRC Guido Venosta Award presented by Sergio Mattarella, President of Italy, for his contribution to bridging the gap between preclinical research and therapy, leading to significant advancements in diagnostic techniques and therapeutic approaches for colorectal cancer.
