= Alberto Bardelli =

Italian geneticist

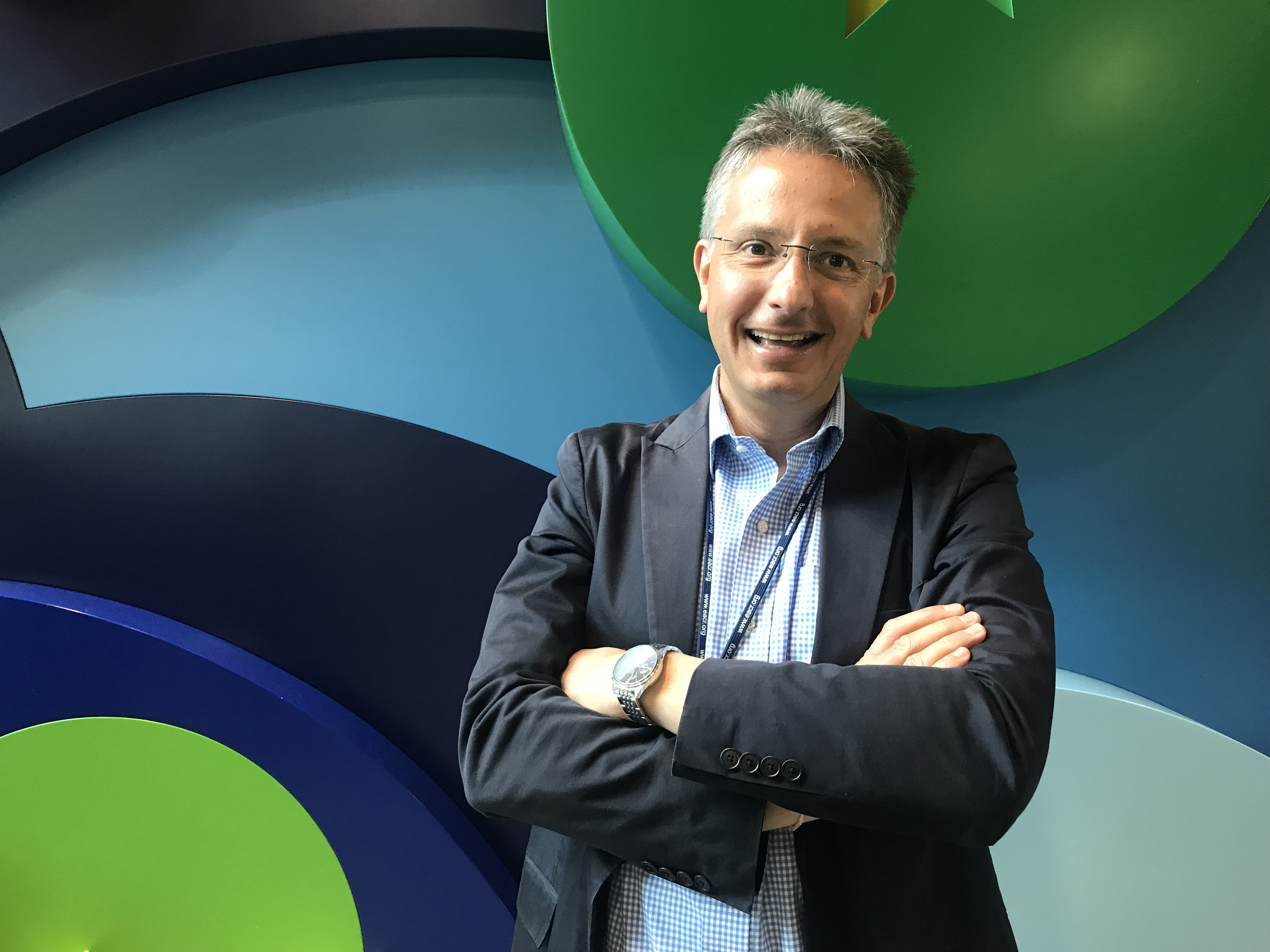
Alberto Bardelli

Alberto Bardelli (born 29 November 1967) is an Italian geneticist and cancer researcher, expert in the field of precision medicine. He is a full professor of histology at the Department of Oncology, University of Turin and Scientific Director of IFOM, the AIRC Institute of Molecular Oncology.

== Career ==
Alberto Bardelli was born in Turin on 29 November 1967. He studied Biological Sciences at the University of Turin and received his master's degree in 1991. After graduation, he moved to the Ludwig Institute for Cancer Research in London and obtained a PhD in Biochemistry and Molecular Biology from the University College London (UCL).

From 1999 to 2004, Bardelli has been a postdoctoral researcher at the Johns Hopkins University School of Medicine and the Howard Hughes Medical Institute, Baltimore (MD/USA), in the group led by Bert Vogelstein. Here Bardelli began studying the genomics of cancer. During his postdoctoral training at Johns Hopkins, Bardelli published multiple papers in high-profile journals such as Nature and Science.

In 2004, he returned to Italy as director of a research unit dedicated to the study of tumour genomes at the Candiolo Cancer Institute and Dept. of Oncology, University of Turin.

Since 2016, he has been a full professor of histology at the University of Turin.

From 2018 to 2020, he served as president of the European Association for Cancer Research (EACR).

He is a member of the scientific committee of the Italian Association for Cancer Research (AIRC).

In 2005, he co-founded the gene editing company Horizon Discovery.

Since April 2022, he has been the scientific director of IFOM, the AIRC Institute of Molecular Oncology, Milan.

== Research ==
Bardelli performed the first comprehensive mutational profile of kinases in colorectal cancers (CRC). He translated these findings into clinical practice in a very productive collaboration with the clinical oncologist Salvatore Siena at Ospedale Niguarda and University of Milan by discovering the molecular landscape of response and resistance to EGFR, HER2 and NTRK1 blockades in CRC. One of the main focuses of his research is the study of the emergence and evolution of drug-resistant clones that can be restrained to improve the efficacy of anticancer agents to develop therapies that adapt to a tumour's evolution. His group used several approaches in their work, including genetic analysis of clinical samples, a large collection of CRC cellular models, patient-derived xenografts (xenopatients), and liquid biopsies. In the last years his studies uncovered the molecular bases of primary and acquired resistance to anti-EGFR therapies in colorectal tumours. These findings have been rapidly translated into clinically applicable predictive biomarkers, which represent the first example of personalized medicine for colorectal tumours and are used to select patients for therapy.

Bardelli also investigated the use of immunotherapy as a tool for precision medicine in CRC. His studies are built on an unconventional approach that an increased dynamic and mutational load in CRC cells can rouse an otherwise slack immune response, a vital requisite for effective immunosurveillance. Bardelli's team tweaked the clonal evolution of the tumour, via a pharmacological intervention, to provoke the persistent renewal of neoantigens.

== Citations ==
Bardelli has authored more than 200 scientific articles, of which 100 were written as an independent investigator. His research papers have been cited over 40,000 times. Bardelli has been listed as a Highly Cited Researcher in the field of Clinical Medicine in Clarivate Web of Science (2014, 2018–2020).

== Awards ==
- 2020 Guido Venosta Award, FIRC AIRC, Presidenza della Repubblica Italiana
- 2019 Elected Member of the Johns Hopkins Society of Scholars
- 2017 ESMO Translational Research Award
- 2017 Fellow of European Molecular Biology Organization (EMBO)
- 2015 Fellow of the European Academy of Cancer Sciences
- 2015 Fellow of the Turin Academy of Sciences

== Honours ==
Bardelli was appointed "Officer" of the Order of Merit of the Italian Republic in 2021.
