= Donna R. Maglott =

American geneticist

- Education: University of Michigan
- Scientific career
- Workplaces: National Center for Biotechnology Information
- Thesis: The structure and function of the 50S ribosome of Escherichia coli (1970)

Donna R. Maglott is a staff scientist at the National Center for Biotechnology Information known for her research on large-scale genomics projects, including the mouse genome and development of databases required for genomics research.

== Education and career ==
Maglott earned her Ph.D. in 1970 from the University of Michigan where she worked on the 50S ribosome in the bacterium Escherichia coli. She held an academic position at Howard University; and then moved to the American Type Culture Center in 1986 where she began establishing databases needed for genomic research. She started at the National Center for Biotechnology Information (NCBI) in 1998.

== Research ==
While at Howard University, Maglott worked on protein synthesis during early development of sea urchins. At ATCC, she worked on repositories holding clone and genomic information and began research using genomic tools to investigate information on human chromosomes. In 2000, Maglott worked with Kim D. Pruitt to introduce RefSeq, a web-based resource for gene-based information that is hosted by NCBI and has been updated over the years. She has also been involved in the development of other databases at NCBI including Entrez Gene, ClinVar, STS markers, Conserved CoDing Sequences (CCDS), Map Viewer, RefSeqGene, the NIH Genetic Testing Registry (GTR), MedGen, and ClinVar. Large-scale genomics projects that Margott has worked on include the rat genome database, and the mouse genome and transcriptome. In 2006, Maglott was a part of the team analyzing the genome of the sea urchin, Strongylocentrotus purpuratus, which was the first genome obtained for a motile marine invertebrate.

== Selected publications ==
- Mouse Genome Sequencing Consortium (2002). "Initial sequencing and comparative analysis of the mouse genome". Nature. 420 (6915): 520–562. Bibcode:2002Natur.420..520W. doi:10.1038/nature01262. ISSN 0028-0836. PMID 12466850.
- Maglott, D. (2004-12-17). "Entrez Gene: gene-centered information at NCBI". Nucleic Acids Research. 33 (Database issue): D54–D58. doi:10.1093/nar/gki031. ISSN 1362-4962. PMC 539985. PMID 15608257.
- Pruitt, Kim D.; Tatusova, Tatiana; Maglott, Donna R. (2007-01-01). "NCBI reference sequences (RefSeq): a curated non-redundant sequence database of genomes, transcripts and proteins". Nucleic Acids Research. 35 (Database issue): D61–65. doi:10.1093/nar/gkl842. ISSN 1362-4962. PMC 1716718. PMID 17130148.
- The International Aphid Genomics Consortium (2010-02-23). Eisen, Jonathan A. (ed.). "Genome Sequence of the Pea Aphid Acyrthosiphon pisum". PLOS Biology. 8 (2) e1000313. doi:10.1371/journal.pbio.1000313. ISSN 1545-7885. PMC 2826372. PMID 20186266.
- Landrum, Melissa J.; Lee, Jennifer M.; Riley, George R.; Jang, Wonhee; Rubinstein, Wendy S.; Church, Deanna M.; Maglott, Donna R. (2014). "ClinVar: public archive of relationships among sequence variation and human phenotype". Nucleic Acids Research. 42 (D1): D980–D985. doi:10.1093/nar/gkt1113. ISSN 0305-1048. PMC 3965032. PMID 24234437.
