= EUCOMM =

The European Conditional Mouse Mutagenesis Program or EUCOMM is an EU-funded program to generate a library of mutant mouse embryonic stem cells for research purposes.

== Setup ==
The EUCOMM program is funded by the European Union sixth R&D programme to make a library of mutant mouse embryonic stem cell clones (ES cells), to enable the mouse research community to rapidly create mutant mice with specific mutant genes. The EUCOMM consortium is a member of the International Knockout Mouse Consortium, (an organisation including the EUCOMM, KOMP, NorCOMM and TIGM consortia) which reflects a commitment to share and promote their products and technology with the international research community.

== Stem cell creation ==
Each stem cell contains one mutant gene copy and one 'wild-type' (normal) gene copy. The entire library is intended to mutate 13,000 genes in total. Of these 13000 mutant genes, 8000 mutations in mouse ES Cells are 'targeted': that is, the mutation which knocks out gene function is inserted precisely into the genome. The remaining 5000 mutations are derived from 'gene-traps'. These mutations are created by infecting ES Cells with an appropriately modified retrovirus. The retrovirus inserts itself 'randomly' into the mouse genome. When it inserts into a gene's intron, the introduced DNA will stop that gene copy being expressed, and the gene is considered to be knocked out (see gene trapping).

The mutations introduced in the ES Cells are conditional: this means that the initial mutation can be modified - by the application of particular DNA-altering enzymes (site specific recombinases) to make the knockout initially latent in the genome. The gene can be later knocked out (inactivated) at a specific time-point or tissue-type in mutant mice derived from the mutant ES Cells, by appropriate breeding to other transgenic mice. This conditionality is a key property of the entire resource, and it allows a more nuanced study of the effects of the gene-knockout.

== Use of stem cells ==
The purpose of this library is to enable the mouse research community to rapidly create mutant mice, by

- selecting the stem cell (with the appropriate mutant gene) from the EUCOMM library and then
- breeding a knockout mouse from that ES Cell (see Knockout mouse)

The broad aim of the project is to facilitate research into gene function in mice (and so by inference in humans) by removing the high technical entry barrier of making the mutant ES Cells.

The 8000 genes selected for mutation in mouse ES cells were drawn from the total set of protein coding mouse genes, based on a rough metric of how easy the genes were to mutate, with the technologies present at the time the project started. More 'target' genes were subsequently added to the list. All products from the program, as well links to the EUCOMM products for specific genes are available from the IKMC site. The distribution of EUCOMM products is being handled by a separate non-commercial organisation, the European Mouse Mutant Cell Repository.
