= Mouse Genetics Project =

The Mouse Genetics Project (MGP) is a large-scale mutant mouse production and phenotyping programme aimed at identifying new model organisms of disease.

Based at the Wellcome Trust Sanger Institute, the project uses knockout mice most of which were generated by the International Knockout Mouse Consortium. For each mutant line, groups of seven male and seven female mice move through a standard analysis pipeline aimed at detecting traits that differ from healthy C57BL/6 mice. The pipeline collects many measurements of viability, fertility, body weight, infection, hearing, morphology, haematology, behaviour, blood chemistry and immunity and compares them to wild type controls using a statistical mixed model. These data are immediately shared among the scientific and medical research community through a bespoke open access database, and summaries are displayed in other online resources, including the Mouse Genome Informatics database and the Wikipedia-based Gene Wiki.

As of July 2013, the MGP reports having over 900 mutant lines openly available to the international research community, and have "substantively complete" analysis for over 650 mutant lines, of which over 75 per cent have at least one abnormal phenotype. Among these are new discoveries of genes implicated in disease, including finding:

- Mutation of SLX4 causes a new type of Fanconi anemia.
- Nine new genes that influence bone strength.
- Mutation of CENPJ models Seckel syndrome.
- SPNS2 is important in mammalian immune system function.
- MYSM1 is important for hematopoiesis and lymphocyte differentiation.

== See also ==
- International Mouse Phenotyping Consortium
- SHIRPA
