= Europhenome =

Europhenome is a resource for presenting, searching and analysing mouse phenotypes that were revealed by high throughput mouse phenotyping programmes such as EUMODIC.

The EuroPhenome project provides access to raw and annotated mouse phenotyping data generated from primary pipelines such as EMPReSSlim and secondary procedures from specialist centres. Mutants of interest can be identified by searching the gene or the predicted phenotype.

== Description ==
EuroPhenome is an open source project to develop a software system for capturing, storing, and analysing raw phenotyping data from standard operating procedures contained in EMPReSS.

EuroPhenome is primarily based in the bioinformatics group at MRC Harwell. The development of EuroPhenome is in collaboration with the Helmholtz Zentrum München, the Wellcome Trust Sanger Institute, and the Clinique de la Souris (France).

Initially, EuroPhenome was developed within the EUMORPHIA (European Union Mouse Research for Public Health and Industrial Applications) programme to capture and store pilot phenotyping data obtained on four background strains (C57BL/6J, C3H/HeBFeJ, BALB/cByJ and 129/SvPas). EUMORPHIA was a large project consisting of 18 research centres in 8 European countries, with the main focus of the project being the development of novel approaches in phenotyping, mutagenesis and informatics to improve the characterisation of mouse models for understanding human molecular physiology and pathology.

The current version of EuroPhenome is capturing data from the EUMODIC project as well as the Wellcome Trust Sanger Institute Mouse Genetics Programme, HMGU German Mouse Clinic pipeline, and the CMHD. EUMODIC is undertaking a primary phenotype assessment of up to 500 mouse mutant lines derived from ES cells developed in the EUCOMM project as well as other lines. Lines showing an interesting phenotype will be subject to a more in depth assessment.

EUMODIC is building upon the database of standardised phenotyping protocols, EMPReSS, developed by the EUMORPHIA project. EUMODIC has developed a selection of these screens, called EMPReSSslim, to enable comprehensive, high throughput, primary phenotyping of large numbers of mice.

== EuroPhenome annotation of phenovariants ==
Phenovariants are annotated using an automated pipeline, which assigns an MP term if the mutant data is statistically different from the baseline data. This data is shown in the Phenomap and the mine for a mutant tool. A statistically significant result and the subsequent MP annotation does not necessarily mean a true phenovariant. There are other factors that could cause this result that have not been accounted for in the analysis. It is the responsibility of the user to download the data and use their expert knowledge or further analysis to decide whether they agree or not.

== See also ==
- International Knockout Mouse Consortium
- International Mouse Phenotyping Consortium
