= Decodeme =

Decodeme may refer to:

- DecodeME, an ongoing genetic study of ME/CFS
- deCODEme, a genetics test that was offered by DeCODE genetics
