= List of fellows of the Royal Society elected in 2019 =

This article lists fellows of the Royal Society who were elected in 2019.

== Fellows ==
1. Salim Abdool Karim
2. Charles Bangham
3. Gurdyal Besra
4. Manjul Bhargava
5. Caucher Birkar
6. Benjamin Blencowe
7. James Briscoe
8. Peter A. Butler
9. Lucy Carpenter
10. Sarah Darby
11. George Davey Smith
12. Martin Embley
13. Bernard Fanaroff
14. Jonathan Flint
15. Véronique Gouverneur
16. Christopher Hacon
17. Mark Handley
18. Richard Harland
19. Peter H. Haynes
20. Martin Head-Gordon
21. Matthew Hurles
22. Richard Jozsa
23. Gagandeep Kang
24. Steve A. Kay
25. John-Michael Kendall
26. Roy Kerr
27. Jonathan C. Knight
28. Marta Kwiatkowska
29. Mark Mayer
30. Gareth H. McKinley
31. David G. Nicholls
32. Christine Orengo
33. Anne Osbourn
34. Anant Parekh
35. Julian Peto
36. Caetano Reis e Sousa
37. John Rodenburg
38. Matthew Rushworth
39. Leonid Sazanov
40. Gregory D. Scholes
41. Barbara Sherwood Lollar
42. Molly Shoichet
43. Liz Sockett
44. Paraskevas Sphicas
45. Jack W. Szostak
46. Andrew D. Taylor
47. Robert Tibshirani
48. Ian Tomlinson
49. Douglass Turnbull
50. Akshay Venkatesh
51. Kumar Wickramasinghe

== Foreign members ==
1. Barry Barish
2. Hans Clevers
3. Sandra Díaz
4. Jack Dongarra
5. Elaine Fuchs
6. Inez Fung
7. David Milstein
8. Akkihebbal Ravishankara
9. James Rothman
10. Brian Staskawicz

== Honorary fellows ==
1. Yusuf Hamied
