= Dominic Kwiatkowski =

English medical researcher (1953–2023)

Dominic Kwiatkowski FRS FMedSci FRCP
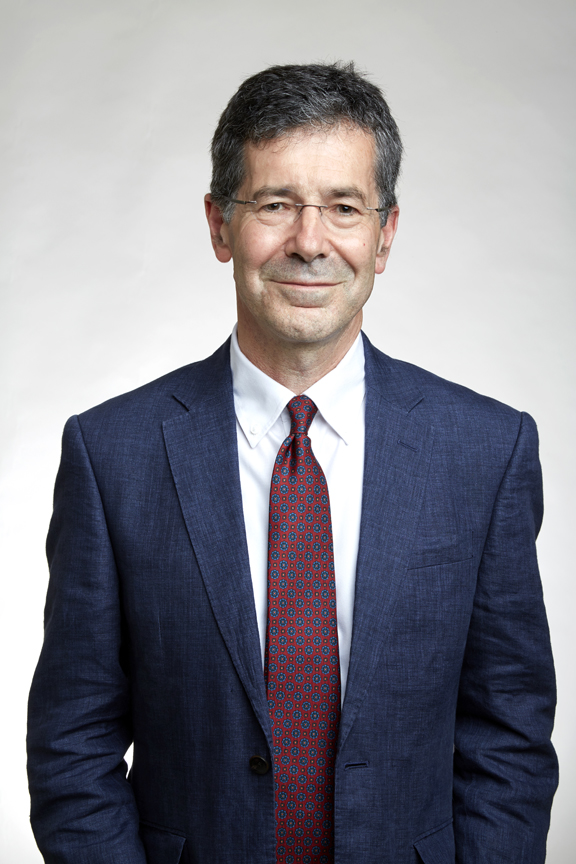
- Kwiatkowski in 2018
- Born: Dominic P. Kwiatkowski; 25 May 1953; Hammersmith, London, England
- Died: 27 April 2023 (aged 69)
- Scientific career
- Fields: Genomics; Malaria
- Institutions: Wellcome Sanger Institute; University of Cambridge; University of Oxford; Guy's Hospital; Leyland Motors
- Website: sanger.ac.uk/people/directory/kwiatkowski-dominic

Dominic Kwiatkowski (25 May 1953 – 27 April 2023) was an English medical researcher and geneticist who was head of the parasites and microbes programme at the Wellcome Sanger Institute in Cambridge and a Professor of Genomics at the University of Oxford. Kwiatkowski applied genomics and computational analysis to problems in infectious disease, with the aim of finding ways to reduce the burden of disease in the developing world.

== Education ==
Kwiatkowski trained as a paediatrician at Guy's Hospital in London.

== Career and research ==
Kwiatkowski spent several years in West Africa, where malaria causes high levels of infant mortality, and this was a major focus of his research over the past thirty years. He made significant contributions to the understanding of malaria pathogenesis and genetic mechanisms of resistance to the disease. He also pioneered genome-wide association studies (GWAS) in Africa and led large international collaborations to characterise the genomic diversity of parasite and mosquito populations around the world. This work is yielding deep insights into the evolutionary biology of drug resistance and pesticide resistance with practical implications for disease control.

In 2005 Kwiatkowski founded a data-sharing network, MalariaGEN, which has fostered productive research collaborations in more than forty malaria endemic countries, and has become a model for equitable sharing of genetic data and research capacity building in resource-poor settings.

== Death ==
Kwiatkowski died on 27 April 2023, at the age of 69.

== Awards and honours ==
Kwiatkowski was elected a Fellow of the Royal Society (FRS) in 2018 and a Fellow of the Academy of Medical Sciences (FMedSci) in 2000.
