= Gurdyal Besra =

British microbiologist

Gurdyal Besra FRS FMedSci
- Born: Gurdyal Singh Besra
- Education: Newcastle University (BSc, PhD)
- Awards: Jeremy Knowles Medal (2014)
- Scientific career
- Fields: Microbiology; Physiology
- Workplaces: Newcastle University; University of Birmingham; Colorado State University
- Thesis: Studies on the lipids of the leprosy bacillus (1990)
- Website: www.birmingham.ac.uk/staff/profiles/biosciences/besra-gurdyal.aspx

Gurdyal Singh Besra is a British scientist who is Bardrick Professor of Microbial Physiology & Chemistry at the University of Birmingham.

== Education ==
Besra was educated at Newcastle University where he was awarded a Bachelor of Science degree 1987 followed by a PhD for studies on the lipids of the leprosy bacillus in 1990.

== Research and career ==
Besra's research on tuberculosis focuses on Mycobacterium tuberculosis cell wall assembly. The cell wall of M. tuberculosis contains a high proportion of unique lipids and sugars. In unravelling and characterising the proteins involved in cell wall biosynthesis, his research identifies potential drug targets, which can then be further exploited using specialised assays, screens and structural biology, to identify new molecules for hit-to-lead programmes for tuberculosis.

Besra's work includes the discovery of M. tuberculosis T-cell lipid antigens and the elucidation of the CD1 antigen presentation pathway. He is also exploring the immunotherapeutic potential of glycosyl ceramides and synthetic small molecules with colleagues against a wide range of tumours and infectious diseases, where it is important to fine tune the hosts immune response through the CD1 pathway.

=== Awards and honours ===
Besra was elected a Fellow of the Royal Society (FRS) in 2019 and a Fellow of the Academy of Medical Sciences (FMedSci) in 2013. He was awarded the Jeremy R. Knowles medal in 2014 by the Royal Society of Chemistry (RSC).
