= Humouse =

Type of genetically modified mouse

A humouse is an immunodeficient mouse reconstituted with a human immune system, also generally known as humanised mouse. Although conventional mouse models have allowed for an increased understanding of mammalian immune systems, this knowledge cannot necessarily be directly applied to humans due to biological differences between the two species.

Humice could theoretically be used as novel pre-clinical models of the human immune system, with uses including assessing vaccine efficacy.

== See also ==
- Immunology
- Knockout mouse
