= Chris Ponting =

British computational biologist

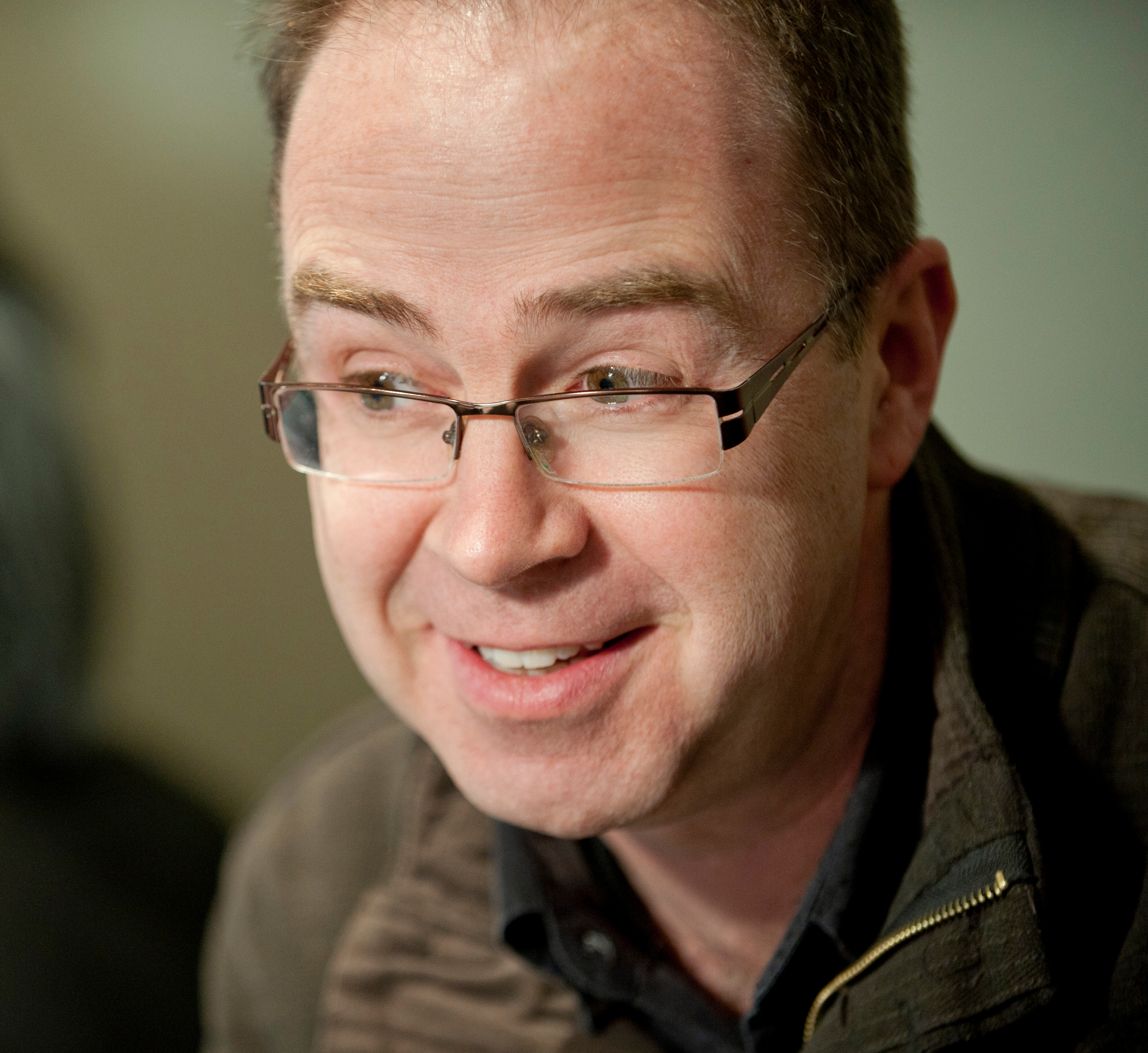
- Born: Christopher Paul Ponting
- Education: University of Oxford (BA, DPhil); University of British Columbia (MSc)
- Known for: SMART
- Scientific career
- Fields: Biology; Computational genomics
- Workplaces: University of Edinburgh
- Thesis: Structural Studies of Plasminogen and Related Proteins (1992)
- Website: www.ed.ac.uk/mrc-human-genetics-unit/research/ponting-group

Christopher Paul Ponting is a British computational biologist, specializing in the evolution and function of genes and genomes. He is currently Chair of Medical Bioinformatics at the University of Edinburgh and group leader in the MRC Human Genetics Unit. He is also an Associate Faculty member of the Wellcome Trust Sanger Institute, a Fellow of the Academy of Medical Sciences, member of the European Molecular Biology Organisation and Fellow of the Royal Society of Edinburgh. His research focuses on long noncoding RNA function and evolution, on single cell biology and on disease genomics. Outside of science, Chris is an amateur novelist and wrote an unpublished, science fiction novel about engineered viruses.

== Education ==
After receiving his Bachelor of Arts and Master of Science in physics from University of Oxford and the University of British Columbia, respectively, he returned to Oxford, completing his Doctor of Philosophy in biophysics in 1992 on structural studies of plasminogen.

== Research ==
Ponting contributed to the Human Genome Project, and participated in sequence comparison for the mouse, rat, chicken, dog, opossum, and platypus Genome Projects. He has also used comparative genomics to contribute directly to the understanding of chromatin structure and the genetics of numerous conditions including asthma, obesity, Alzheimer's disease, retinitis pigmentosa, muscular dystrophies, and Aicardi–Goutières syndrome.

Additionally, his lab is part of DecodeME, a genetic study to determine the potential causes of myalgic encephalomyelitis/chronic fatigue syndrome (ME/CFS).
