= International Mouse Phenotyping Consortium =

Content
- Description: Encyclopaedia of phenotypes from knockout mice.
- Organisms: Mouse

Contact
- Primary citation: Brown and Moore, 2012
- Release date: 2011

Access
- Website: http://www.mousephenotype.org

The International Mouse Phenotyping Consortium (IMPC) is an international scientific endeavour to create and characterize the phenotype of 20,000 knockout mouse strains. Launched in September 2011, the consortium consists of over 15 research institutes across four continents with funding provided by the NIH, European national governments and the partner institutions.

The initiative is projected to take 10 years (until 2021), and will focus on analysing homozygous mutant mice generated on an isogenic C57BL/6N background by the International Knockout Mouse Consortium. The mouse strains are characterized in a broad based phenotyping pipeline that is focused on revealing insights into human disease by measuring embryonic, neuromuscular, sensory, cardiovascular, metabolic, respiratory, haematological, and neurological parameters. The protocols used to assess these phenotypes have been standardized across the IMPC partners and are available at IMPReSS.

Mouse strains generated by the IMPC partners are deposited at the KOMP repository and the European Mutant Mouse Archive. In many cases, strains carrying one of two types of alleles will be archived - a null allele used in the primary IMPC phenotyping pipeline and a conditional ready allele that allows tissue restricted knockouts via the Cre-Lox Recombination and FLP-FRT recombination systems.

The phenotypic data is recorded in a freely accessible, fully searchable online database, generating what has been described as a "comprehensive encyclopaedia of mammalian gene function."

== IMPReSS ==
IMPReSS
Content
- Description: Standardized protocols for phenotyping mutant mouse strains.
- Organisms: Mouse

Contact
- Primary citation: Brown and Moore, 2012
- Release date: 2012

Access
- Website: http://www.mousephenotype.org/impress

The International Mouse Phenotyping Resource of Standardised Screens (IMPReSS) coordinates and presents standardized protocols that are used by mouse research clinics to assess biological characteristics of mutant mouse strains. IMPReSS was launched in 2011 to help the IMPC achieve its goal of characterizing a knockout mouse strain for every gene and will continue to be actively developed for the ten year life-time of the project. IMPReSS, the successor of EMPReSS, is built on the concept of a "phenotype pipeline": a sequence of individual procedures performed on a mouse at a specified age and organized to minimize interference from one procedure to the next. Each procedure is broken down into a set of multiple parameters that capture both data and metadata. Data parameters are associated with biomedical ontology terms in order to facilitate data sharing and to aid in the identification of phenotypic mouse-models of human diseases.

== EMPReSS ==
The European Mouse Phenotyping Resource for Standardized Screens (EMPReSS), the predecessor for IMPReSS, developed more than a 150 standardized protocols for the characterization of mutant mouse strains across European research institutes as part of the EUMODIC and EUMORPHIA projects. EMPReSS was actively developed from 2002 until it was superseded by IMPReSS in 2011. Phenotype data collected from EMPReSS protocols is available at Europhenome.

== Embryonic-lethal knockout lines ==
Around 30% of all targeted gene knockouts in mice result in embryonic or perinatal death. The effects of these mutations cannot therefore be studied in live adult mice, except as heterozygote mutants. However, systematic studies of embryonic-lethal knockouts are important to understand how these genes influence embryo development and survival.

In 2013 the IMPC published the Bloomsbury report on mouse embryo phenotyping, outlining a standard pipeline for the screening of embryonic-lethal knockouts in homozygote mutants. In the UK, their recommendations form the basis of the DMDD (Deciphering the Mechanisms of Developmental Disorders) project.

== History ==
Launched in 2011, the IMPC has been organised into successive phases, with the goal of creating and phenotyping a knock‑out line for every protein‑coding gene in the mouse genome. By the end of the first phase, more than 5 000 mutant lines had been produced and characterised, revealing that nearly one third of the targeted genes were essential for viability and providing several hundred new models of human disease. Since then, the consortium has expanded its catalogue to over 9 000 genes, integrating more than 100 million data points into the IMPC portal, which are now widely used in thousands of published studies and in clinical and preclinical databases.

== Role of the mouse model in the IMPC ==
The IMPC uses the laboratory mouse (Mus musculus), primarily on the C57BL/6N genetic background, as a mammalian model organism to systematically determine the function of every protein‑coding gene. By generating knockout mouse lines for each gene, the IMPC establishes gene–phenotype associations, revealing how the loss of specific genes affects viability, anatomy, physiology, biochemistry, and behaviour.

This standardized mouse model allows the consortium to identify novel disease‑related genes and generate candidate mouse models of human diseases, including metabolic, cardiovascular, neurological, and developmental disorders. Data from these mice—such as blood tests, imaging, metabolic profiles, and behavioural assays—are collected through high‑throughput phenotyping pipelines and made publicly accessible via the IMPC Portal, enabling researchers worldwide to compare phenotypes and refine models of human pathologies.

== See also ==
- Sanger Mouse Genetics Project
