= Matthew Hurles =

British scientist (born 1974)

Matt Hurles FRS FMedSci
- Born: Matthew Edward Hurles; 8 May 1974 (age 52); Hammersmith, London, England
- Education: Hampton School; University of Oxford (BA); University of Leicester (PhD)
- Awards: Crick Lecture (2013)
- Scientific career
- Fields: Genetics
- Workplaces: Wellcome Sanger Institute; University of Cambridge; Congenica Ltd
- Thesis: Mutation and variability of the human Y chromosome (1999)
- Doctoral advisor: Mark Jobling
- Website: www.sanger.ac.uk/people/directory/hurles-matthew

Matthew Edward Hurles FRS FMedSci (born 1974) is a British scientist, director of the Wellcome Sanger Institute and an honorary professor of Human Genetics and Genomics at the University of Cambridge.

== Education ==
Hurles was privately educated at Hampton School and the University of Oxford where he was awarded a Bachelor of Arts degree in Biochemistry. He completed his PhD in 1999 on the genetics of the Y chromosome at the University of Leicester supervised by Mark Jobling.

== Research and career ==
Hurles research investigates the causes and consequences of new mutations as DNA is passed from one generation to the next. He is best known for his work on characterizing the extent and impact of structural variation in the human genome and on deciphering the genetic architecture of severe neurodevelopmental disorders.

Hurles group has used large-scale genomic studies to highlight the predominant role that new mutations of many different types play in causing diverse developmental disorders and has led to the discovery of tens of previously unrecognised genetic diseases.

=== Awards and honours ===
Hurles was elected a Fellow of the Royal Society (FRS) in 2019. He is also a Fellow of the Academy of Medical Sciences (FMedSci) and was awarded the Crick Medal and Lecture in 2013.
