= Charles Bangham =

Chair of Immunology at Imperial College London

Charles Bangham FRS FMedSci FRCPath
- Born: Charles R. M. Bangham
- Education: University of Cambridge; University of Oxford br>University of London
- Scientific career
- Fields: Virology; Immunology
- Workplaces: Imperial College London; National Institute for Medical Research
- Thesis: The cellular immune response to respiratory syncytial virus in mouse and man (1987)
- Website: www.imperial.ac.uk/people/c.bangham

Charles Bangham is a British scientist who holds the Chair in Immunology at Imperial College London.

== Education ==
Bangham was educated at the University of Cambridge (BA) and the University of Oxford where he was awarded a Bachelor of Medicine, Bachelor of Surgery (BM, BCh). He completed his PhD on immune responses to respiratory syncytial virus (RSV) while working at the National Institute for Medical Research in 1987.

== Research and career ==
Since 1987 Bangham has conducted research on the Human T-lymphotropic virus 1 (HTLV-1). His contributions include the discovery of the viral synapse, the mechanism by which viruses including HTLV-1, HIV and murine leukaemia virus (MLV) are transmitted from cell-to-cell, starting a new field in virology.

=== Awards and honours ===
Bangham was elected a Fellow of the Royal Society (FRS) in 2019. He is also a Fellow of the Academy of Medical Sciences (FMedSci) since 2003 and a Fellow of the Royal College of Pathologists (FRCPath).
