= SHIRPA =

SHIRPA is a standardized set of experimental procedures used by scientists to characterize the phenotype of genetically modified laboratory mice. The protocols are designed to test muscle function, cerebellar function, sensory function and neuropsychiatric function.

== Origin ==
SHIRPA is an acronym of SmithKline Beecham, Harwell, Imperial College, Royal London Hospital, phenotype assessment), proposed in 1997 by a group of researchers from a number of British institutions and the pharmaceutical company, SmithKline Beecham. There are up to 40 tests in SHIRPA, across three screens of increasing complexity and specialization. The first describes the behavior of the mouse subject by observation. The second involves a more thorough behavioral assessment and includes pathological analysis. The third screening stage is focused on potential animal models of neurological disease.

== Testing of mutant mice ==
The protocol has been used to test several mutant mice, including dystrophin-deficient mutants, transgenic models of amyotrophic lateral sclerosis and Alzheimer's disease, and a spontaneous mutant with degeneration of the cerebellum.

== Modifications ==
The first part of the SHIRPA protocol was changed to include observations on morphology and dysmorphology. This protocol became known as the "modified SHIRPA" and has been used to screen for dominant phenotypes in mice.

== See also ==
- Sanger Mouse Genetics Project
