= Benjamin Blencowe =

British and Canadian molecular biologist

Benjamin Blencowe FRS FRSC
- Born: Benjamin Joseph Blencowe
- Education: Imperial College London (BSc); University of London (PhD)
- Awards: John Polanyi Award (2011)
- Scientific career
- Fields: Gene regulation RNA processing Alternative splicing Functional genomics
- Workplaces: Imperial College London; European Molecular Biology Laboratory; Massachusetts Institute of Technology; University of Toronto
- Thesis: The application of antisense technology to the study of mammalian pre-mRNA splicing factors. (1991)
- Academic advisors: Angus Lamond; Phillip Allen Sharp
- Website: http://sites.utoronto.ca/intron/index.html

Benjamin Joseph Blencowe FRS FRSC is a British and Canadian molecular biologist, currently appointed as Professor and Banbury Chair in Medical Research at the University of Toronto. He also serves as Director of the University of Toronto’s Donnelly Sequencing Centre. He teaches in the Department of Molecular Genetics and his lab is part of the Donnelly Centre for Cellular and Biomolecular Research.

== Education ==
Blencowe studied microbiology and molecular biology at Imperial College London, where he received an BSc (with first class honours) in 1988. He undertook graduate research at the European Molecular Biology Laboratory, as an external student of the University of London, earning his PhD in 1991.

== Career and research ==
After receiving his PhD, Blencowe joined the Center of Cancer Research (renamed Koch Institute for Integrative Cancer Research) at the Massachusetts Institute of Technology as a Human Frontier Science Program Long Term Fellow in 1992. He was appointed Assistant Professor at University of Toronto in 1998 and promoted to full Professor in 2006.

Blencowe’s research focuses on fundamental questions relating to RNA biology. His research group has made pioneering contributions to the development and application of high-throughput methods for studying RNA processing and RNA-RNA interactions. This research has contributed global-scale insights into the complexity, evolution, regulation and function of alternative splicing, including the discovery of splicing networks that control stem cell pluripotency and neurogenesis. His most recent research led to the discovery of a program of alternative splicing that is commonly disrupted in neurological disorders, work that has opened the door to a new therapeutic strategy for autism.

=== Selected publications ===
- Pan Q, Shai O, Misquitta C, Zhang W, Saltzman AL, Mohammad N, Babak T, Siu H, Hughes TR, Morris QD, Frey BJ, Blencowe BJ (2004). "Revealing global regulatory features of mammalian alternative splicing using a quantitative microarray platform". Mol. Cell. 16 (6): 929–41. doi:10.1016/j.molcel.2004.12.004. PMID 15610736.
- Blencowe BJ (2006). "Alternative splicing: new insights from global analyses". Cell. 126 (1): 37–47. doi:10.1016/j.cell.2006.06.023. PMID 16839875. S2CID 7606539.
- Pan Q, Shai O, Lee LJ, Frey BJ, Blencowe BJ (2008). "Deep surveying of alternative splicing complexity in the human transcriptome by high-throughput sequencing". Nat. Genet. 40 (12): 1413–5. doi:10.1038/ng.259. PMID 18978789. S2CID 9228930.
- Calarco JA, Superina S, O'Hanlon D, Gabut M, Raj B, Pan Q, Skalska U, Clarke L, Gelinas D, van der Kooy D, Zhen M, Ciruna B, Blencowe BJ (2009). "Regulation of vertebrate nervous system alternative splicing and development by an SR-related protein". Cell. 138 (5): 898–910. doi:10.1016/j.cell.2009.06.012. PMID 19737518. S2CID 18341158.
- Barash Y, Calarco JA, Gao W, Pan Q, Wang X, Shai O, Blencowe BJ, Frey BJ (2010). "Deciphering the splicing code". Nature. 465 (7294): 53–9. Bibcode:2010Natur.465...53B. doi:10.1038/nature09000. PMID 20445623. S2CID 2398858.
- Gabut M, Samavarchi-Tehrani P, Wang X, Slobodeniuc V, O'Hanlon D, Sung HK, Alvarez M, Talukder S, Pan Q, Mazzoni EO, Nedelec S, Wichterle H, Woltjen K, Hughes TR, Zandstra PW, Nagy A, Wrana JL, Blencowe BJ (2011). "An alternative splicing switch regulates embryonic stem cell pluripotency and reprogramming". Cell. 147 (1): 132–46. doi:10.1016/j.cell.2011.08.023. PMID 21924763. S2CID 4978953.
- Barbosa-Morais NL, Irimia M, Pan Q, Xiong HY, Gueroussov S, Lee LJ, Slobodeniuc V, Kutter C, Watt S, Colak R, Kim T, Misquitta-Ali CM, Wilson MD, Kim PM, Odom DT, Frey BJ, Blencowe BJ (2012). "The evolutionary landscape of alternative splicing in vertebrate species". Science. 338 (6114): 1587–93. Bibcode:2012Sci...338.1587B. doi:10.1126/science.1230612. PMID 23258890. S2CID 37453436.
- Han H, Irimia M, Ross PJ, Sung HK, Alipanahi B, David L, Golipour A, Gabut M, Michael IP, Nachman EN, Wang E, Trcka D, Thompson T, O'Hanlon D, Slobodeniuc V, Barbosa-Morais NL, Burge CB, Moffat J, Frey BJ, Nagy A, Ellis J, Wrana JL, Blencowe BJ (2013). "MBNL proteins repress ES-cell-specific alternative splicing and reprogramming". Nature. 498 (7453): 241–5. Bibcode:2013Natur.498..241H. doi:10.1038/nature12270. PMC 3933998. PMID 23739326.
- Irimia M, Weatheritt RJ, Ellis JD, Parikshak NN, Gonatopoulos-Pournatzis T, Babor M, Quesnel-Vallières M, Tapial J, Raj B, O'Hanlon D, Barrios-Rodiles M, Sternberg MJ, Cordes SP, Roth FP, Wrana JL, Geschwind DH, Blencowe BJ (2014). "A highly conserved program of neuronal microexons is misregulated in autistic brains". Cell. 159 (7): 1511–23. doi:10.1016/j.cell.2014.11.035. PMC 4390143. PMID 25525873.
- Gueroussov S, Weatheritt RJ, O'Hanlon D, Lin ZY, Narula A, Gingras AC, Blencowe BJ (2017). "Regulatory Expansion in Mammals of Multivalent hnRNP Assemblies that Globally Control Alternative Splicing". Cell. 170 (2): 324–339.e23. doi:10.1016/j.cell.2017.06.037. PMID 28709000.

=== Honors and awards ===
Blencowe received the Premier of Ontario Research Excellence Award in 1999 and the Canadian Society of Molecular Biosciences Senior Investigator Award in 2011. He was a recipient of the Natural Sciences and Engineering Research Council of Canada John C. Polanyi Award in 2011 for his contributions to the understanding of the RNA splicing code. Blencowe was elected Fellow of the Royal Society of Canada (FRSC) in 2017, and Fellow of the Royal Society (FRS) in 2019. He was elected Fellow of the Academy of Medical Sciences (FMedSci) in 2025.
