= Kim D. Pruitt =

American bioinformatician

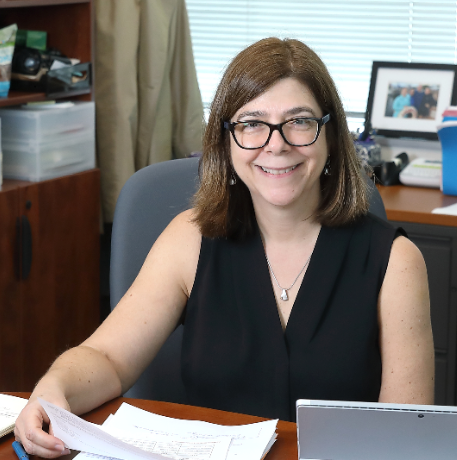
- Born: 1961 (age 64–65)
- Education: Cornell University (PhD)
- Known for: RefSeq
- Children: 2
- Scientific career
- Fields: Bioinformatics
- Workplaces: National Center for Biotechnology Information
- Thesis: Structure and expression of the Petunia mitochondrial S-PCF locus and cytochrome oxidase subunit II genes (1990)
- Doctoral advisor: Maureen Hanson

Kim Dixon Pruitt (born 1961) is an American bioinformatician. She is chief of the information engineering branch at the National Center for Biotechnology Information. Pruitt led the development of the RefSeq gene database.

== Education ==
Pruitt began her doctoral research in 1983. Her mentor was Maureen Hanson. Pruitt completed a Ph.D. in genetics from Cornell University. Her 1990 dissertation was titled Structure and expression of the Petunia mitochondrial S-PCF locus and cytochrome oxidase subunit II genes. After seeing a Science interview of James M. Ostell at the National Center for Biotechnology Information (NCBI) about bioinformatics, Pruitt began working as a postdoctoral fellow at the United States National Library of Medicine (NLM). While completing her research, Pruitt approached Ostell and asked if she could work for him part-time while she was there. As a result, the following year and half from spring 1997 until mid-1998 Pruitt basically had two postdoctoral fellowships.

== Career ==
Pruitt joined the NLM in 1998. Ostell hired Pruitt to develop a new project to keep track of curated sequences for the human genome. This program developed into a database of genes known as RefSeq and was released to the public in the Spring of 1999. By 2016, Pruitt managed a team of 22 scientists and worked closely with computer programmers and other teams who supported specific portions of the RefSeq data set. Pruitt's group curated data and created sequence records for humans, animals, plants, fungi, and bacteria. Her curation team expanded significantly between 2012 and 2016 to now support everything except the viruses.

In 2017, she became acting chief of the information engineering branch (IEB) at NCBI, where she established a production services operating board to communicate on the status and future directions of critical services, including PubMed, PubMed Central, PubChem, ClinicalTrials.gov, GenBank, BLAST, Pathogen Detection, ClinVar, and dbGaP. This effort led to notable changes to guide and inform product decisions and development priorities.

In 2019, Pruitt became chief of the IEB. As chief, Pruitt is responsible for NCBI's collection, creation, analysis, organization, curation, and dissemination of data and analysis tools in the areas of molecular biology and genetics, as well as for the collection and management of bibliographic information. Pruitt leads NCBI's more than 500 highly skilled scientific and technical staff in the design, development, and maintenance of databases, information systems, and software tools, as well as operational management of data submissions, quality checks, and data access. Pruitt's appointment was lauded by NLM director Patricia Flatley Brennan and NCBI director James M. Ostell.

== Personal life ==
Pruitt is married and has two daughters.
