= DecodeME =

Genetic study on ME/CFS

- The study's official logo
- Purpose: Research (DNA)
- ICD-10-PCS: G93.32.

DecodeME is a genome-wide association study searching for genetic risk factors for Myalgic encephalomyelitis/chronic fatigue syndrome (ME/CFS). With a planned recruitment of 25,000 patients, it is expected to be the largest such study to date. Recruitment closed on 15 November 2023 and preliminary results were published in a preprint on 7 August 2025.

== Background ==
ME/CFS is a chronic medical condition that often causes significant disability, and whose cause is unknown. Genetic studies of ME/CFS have been done before, but without significant findings. The authors of a 2022 study suggested that research with more participants is needed to discover statistically significant differences.

DecodeME aims to perform such a large study. It is being run as a partnership between Action for ME and the University of Edinburgh's MRC Human Genetics Unit, with Chris Ponting as chief investigator, and with £3.2 million in funding from the UK's Medical Research Council and the National Institute for Health Research. The researchers have also worked with Forward ME and a group of patient advocates, the latter of which contributed to the design of the study.

The investigators hope the study's findings will inform further research into the pathology of ME/CFS and potential treatments. They also hope that discovering a genetic connection will help dispel some of the stigma around ME/CFS.

== History ==
The study announced receipt of funding in June 2020, and recruitment was opened on 12 September 2022. In January 2023, the team wrote that over 17,000 patients had completed the survey, of which almost 9,000 were sent collection kits. On 2 May 2023 they announced that over 10,000 people had been asked to provide samples.

In June 2023, DecodeME made changes to their data analysis methodology that allowed them to invite additional participants to give DNA. Recruitment for the study closed on 15 November 2023. A preprint of the preliminary results was released on 7 August 2025.

== Methodology ==
DecodeME is a genome-wide association study with a case-control design. Expected recruitment is at least 20,000 patients whose onset was not associated with COVID-19, and 5,000 people with long COVID who were diagnosed with ME/CFS after COVID-19. DNA will be collected by sending patients kits to collect saliva at home and control samples will be obtained from the UK Biobank. There will also be a survey to collect data on symptoms. If new risk factors are identified, it may enable further research into potential causes, tests, or treatments.
