= Maureen Hanson =

American molecular biologist

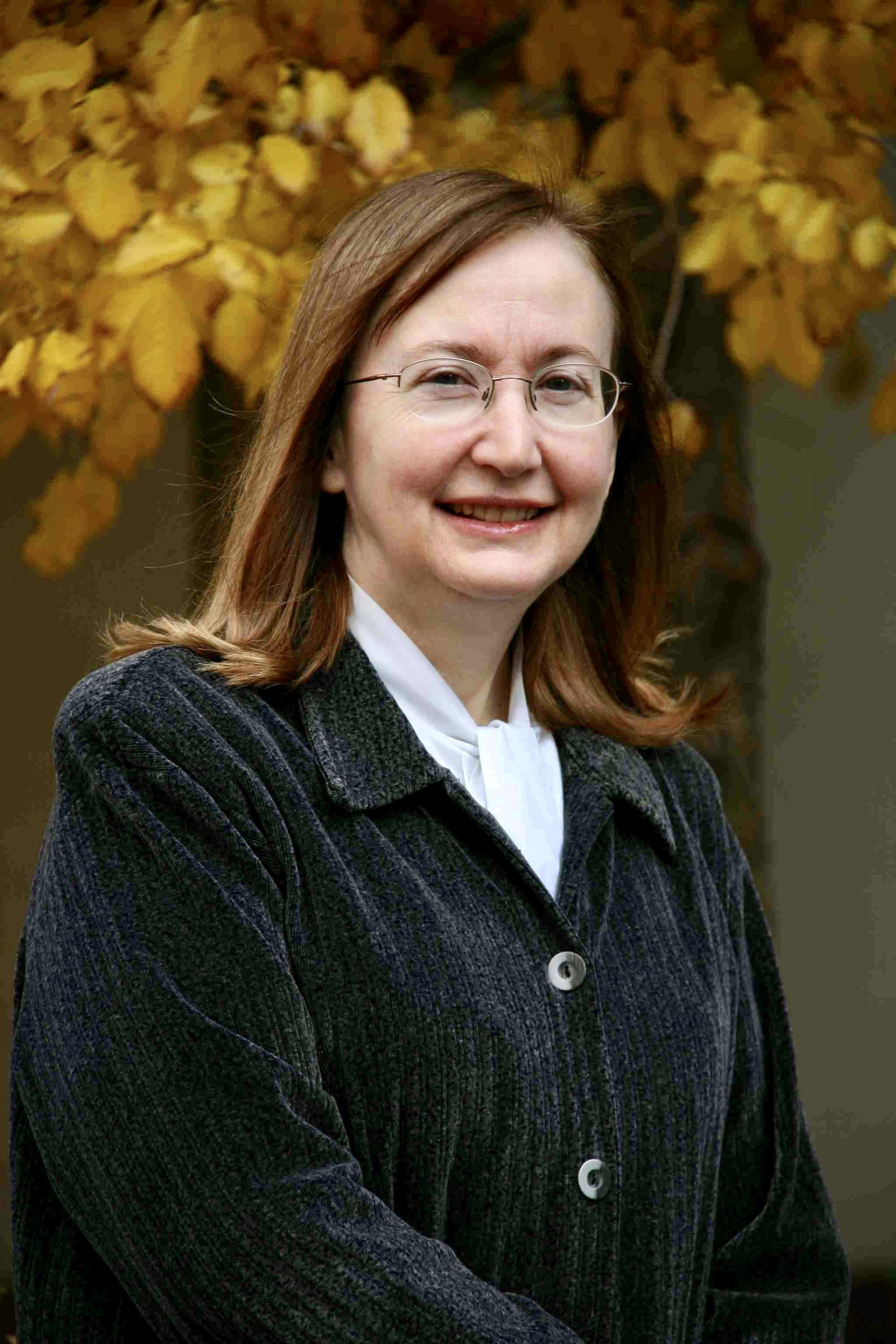
- Education: Duke University (B.S) Harvard University (Ph.D) Harvard University (Postdoctoral Fellow)
- Awards: Lawrence Bogorad Award of the American Society of Plant Biologists (2006); Cornell University Award for Outstanding Accomplishments in Basic Research (2009)
- Scientific career
- Fields: Plant reproductive biology Plant organelle biology RNA editing Myalgic encephalomyelitis/chronic fatigue syndrome
- Workplaces: University of Virginia; Cornell University
- Thesis: The genetics and biochemistry of chloroplast ribosomes mutants of Chlamydomonas reinhardi (1976)
- Website: https://hansonlab.org/ https://neuroimmune.cornell.edu/

Maureen Hanson is an American molecular biologist and Liberty Hyde Bailey Professor in the Department of Molecular Biology and Genetics at Cornell University in Ithaca, New York. She is a joint member of the Section of Plant Biology and Director of the Center for Enervating Neuroimmune Disease. Her research concerns gene expression in chloroplasts and mitochondria, photosynthesis, and the molecular basis of the disease Myalgic Encephalomyelitis/Chronic Fatigue Syndrome (ME/CFS).

== Early life and education ==
Hanson grew up in the Maryland suburbs of Washington D.C. She attended Duke University, where she received a B.S. degree in Botany. She completed a Ph.D. in Lawrence Bogorad's lab in the Department of Biology at Harvard University. Subsequently, she held an National Institutes of Health National Research Service Award postdoctoral fellowship in Frederick M. Ausubel's lab at Harvard.

== Research and career ==
Hanson joined the faculty of the Department of Biology at the University of Virginia, Charlottesville, as Assistant Professor in 1979. There she studied the phenomenon of cytoplasmic male sterility (CMS), using the model system Petunia. With Ellora Young, she identified a mutant chimeric mitochondrial gene that encodes a toxic protein that results in abortion of pollen development. Subsequently, most CMS-encoding genes have been found to be composed of abnormal chimeric gene fusions. After she moved to Cornell in 1985 as Associate Professor, Stéphane Bentolila in her group used map-based cloning to find the dominant nuclear Restorer of Fertility (Rf) gene, making Petunia the first plant to have both the CMS mitochondrial gene and nuclear restorer pair identified in the same species. The Petunia Rf gene was the first such gene to be identified as encoding a pentatricopeptide repeat (PPR) protein, part of a family now known to also be involved in organelle RNA editing and other types of RNA metabolism. Most of the Rf genes cloned from other species have been found to be PPR proteins.

Hanson's group was the first to utilize GFP technology to label plastids and mitochondria in plants. As a result, Rainer Köhler in her group rediscovered plastid protrusions, which had been observed as long ago as 1908, but not previously established as a genuine feature of plant cell biology. Hanson named these structures "stromules" and demonstrated that proteins flow through them and examined their tissue-specific abundance. Now it is known that these structures are involved in a number of phenomena, include plant defense responses.

Hanson has also made many contributions to the understanding of C-to-U RNA editing in chloroplasts and plant mitochondria. Among these are the identification of several of the protein families whose members form the diverse set of editosomes, RNA/protein complexes that carry out editing in plant organelles.

Hanson began working in the area of synthetic biology for improving photosynthesis in 2011. Since then, her lab has published on attempts to introduce cyanobacterial carboxysomes into plants and engineering Rubisco, with collaborating labs of Martin Parry (Lancaster, UK) and Stephen Long (U. Illinois). Her lab utilizes chloroplast transformation to modify plants.

Due to personal interest in the disease, in 2009 Hanson initiated an additional research program on Myalgic Encephalomyelitis/Chronic Fatigue Syndrome (ME/CFS). Her group has increased the understanding of the disruptions at the molecular level that occur in this disease, which was long erroneously claimed to be a psychological illness. Her lab has demonstrated an altered gut microbiome and altered plasma metabolites, characterized mitochondrial genomes and extracellular vesicles, observed abnormal cytokine networks, and examined T cell metabolism in ME/CFS patients vs. controls

== Awards and honors ==
- Member, American Academy of Arts and Sciences, 2021
- Member, National Academy of Sciences, 2021
- Fellow, American Society of Plant Biologists, 2017
- Award for Outstanding Accomplishments in Basic Research, College of Agriculture and Life Sciences, Cornell, 2009
- Chancellor's Award for Excellence in Faculty Service, State University of New York, 2008
- Lawrence Bogorad Award of the American Society of Plant Biologists, 2006
- Liberty Hyde Bailey Professor, Cornell University
- American Association for the Advancement of Science, Elected Fellow, 1989
- McKnight Foundation, Individual Research Award, 1983-86
- National Institutes of Health Postdoctoral Fellow, 1976-79
- National Science Foundation Predoctoral Fellow, 1971-74
- Woodrow Wilson Honorary Fellow, 1971
- Recognized as a Pioneer Member of the American Society of Plant Biologists.
