= ClinVar =

ClinVar is a public archive with free access to reports on the relationships between human genetic variations and phenotypes, with supporting evidence. The database includes germline and somatic variants of any size, type or genomic location. Interpretations are submitted by clinical testing laboratories, research laboratories, locus-specific databases, UniProt, expert panels and practical guidelines.
