= Wellcome Sanger Institute =

British genomics research institute

- Established: 1992
- Director: Matthew Hurles
- Faculty: 32
- Staff: ~900
- Address: Wellcome Genome Campus
- Location: Hinxton, Cambridgeshire, United Kingdom
- Coordinates: 52°04′39″N 00°11′15″E
- Interactive map of Wellcome Sanger Institute
- Website: sanger.ac.uk

The Wellcome Sanger Institute, previously known as The Sanger Centre and Wellcome Trust Sanger Institute, is a non-profit British genomics and genetics research institute, primarily funded by the Wellcome Trust.

It is located on the Wellcome Genome Campus by the village of Hinxton, outside Cambridge. It shares this location with the European Bioinformatics Institute. It was established in 1992 and named after double Nobel laureate Frederick Sanger. It was conceived as a large scale DNA sequencing centre to participate in the Human Genome Project, and went on to make the largest single contribution to the gold standard sequence of the human genome. From its inception the institute established and has maintained a policy of data sharing, and does much of its research in collaboration.

Since 2000, the institute expanded its mission to understand "the role of genetics in health and disease". The institute now employs around 900 people and engages in six main areas of research: Somatic Genomics; Cellular Genomics; Human Genetics; Parasite and Microbes; Generative Genomics, and the Tree of Life.

== Facilities and resources ==
=== Campus ===
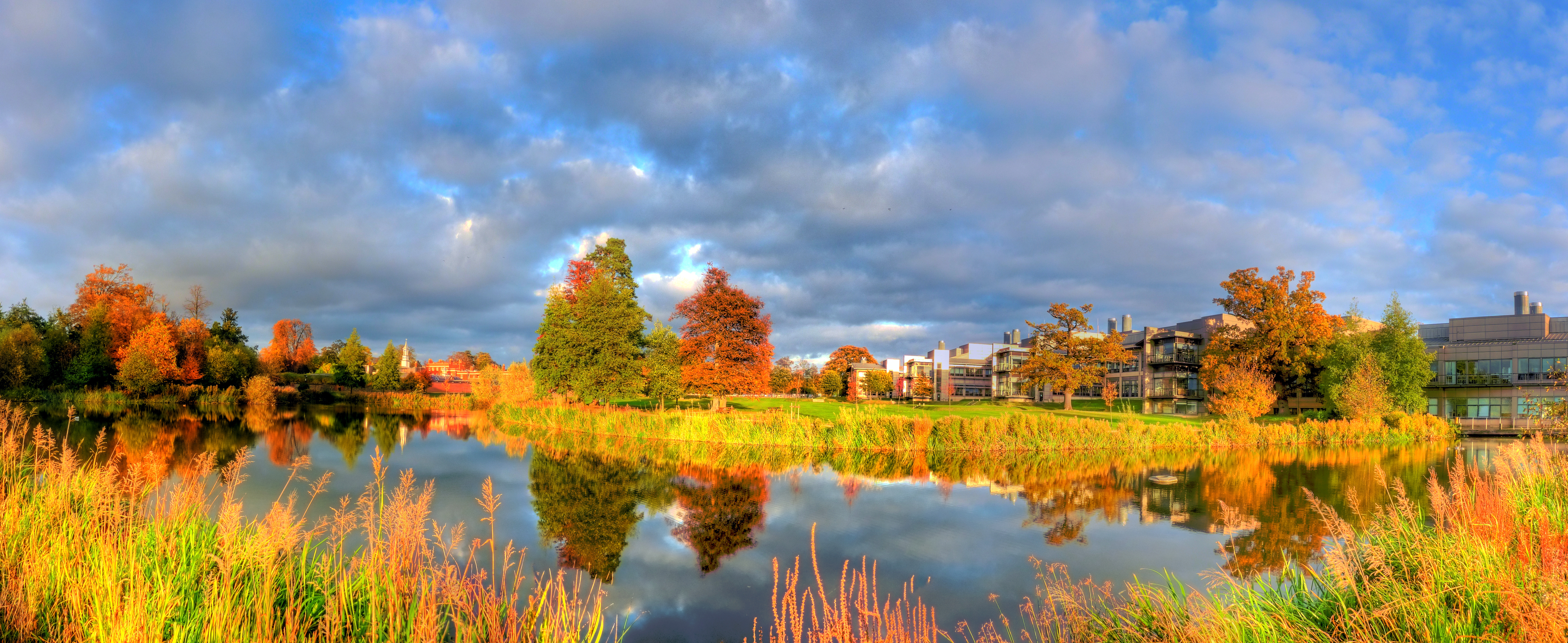
The Wellcome Genome Campus

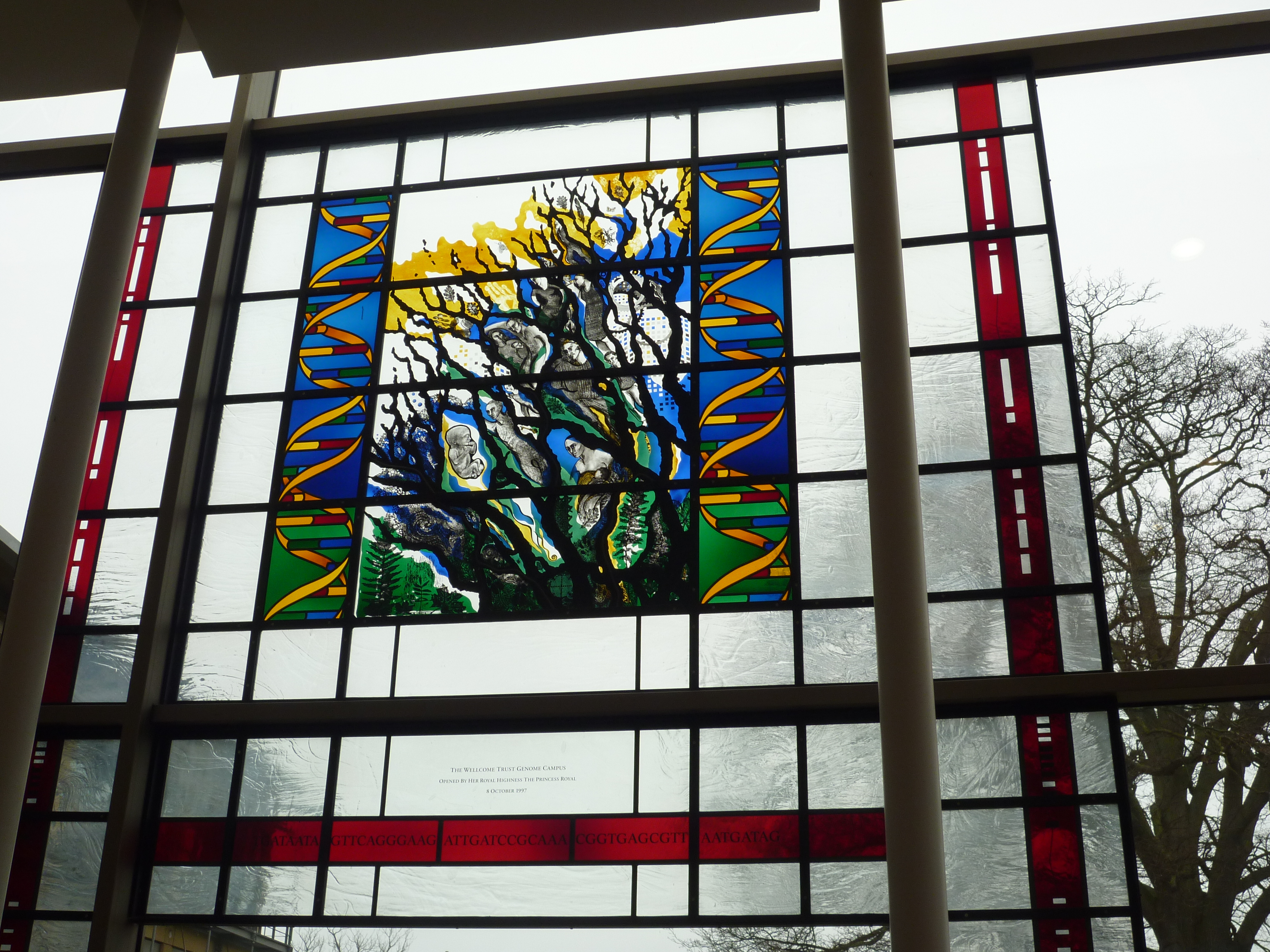
Commemorative stain window located in the Sulston building of the Wellcome Sanger Institute, to mark the opening of the Genome Campus

In 1993 the then 17 Sanger Centre staff moved into temporary laboratory space at Hinxton Hall in Cambridgeshire. This 55-acre (220,000 m^{2}) site was to become the Wellcome Genome Campus, which has a growing population of around 1300 staff, approximately 900 of whom work at the Sanger Institute. The Genome Campus also includes the Wellcome Trust Conference Centre and the European Bioinformatics Institute. A major extension of the campus was officially opened in 2005; the buildings accommodate new laboratories, a data centre and staff amenities. In discussing the name of the centre, Sanger (still alive when the centre was opened) told John Sulston, the founding director, that the centre "had better be good." Sulston commented, "I rather wished I hadn't asked."

=== Sequencing ===
The Sanger Institute's sequencing staff handle millions of DNA samples each week. The institute "capitalises on leading-edge technologies to answer questions unanswerable only a few years ago". The advances in technology allow the Sanger Institute to carry out sequencing of the genomes of individual humans, vertebrate species and pathogens, at an ever-increasing pace and reducing cost. The institute has more than 100 ongoing pathogen sequencing projects. The output of the Sanger Institute is around 10 billion bases of raw sequence data per day.

=== Scientific resources ===
Bioinformatic databases resources are one of the outcomes of research programmes that the Sanger Institute is involved in. Those hosted by the Sanger Institute include:

- COSMIC, a catalogue of somatic mutations in cancer
- DECIPHER, a database of chromosomal imbalance and phenotype in humans, using Ensembl resources
- Ensembl, a genome browser co-hosted by the European Bioinformatics Institute.
- GeneDB, a pathogen sequence database
- Mouse Genetics Project, including a database of standardised phenotypic analysis for many hundreds of mutant mice.
- Vega, a vertebrate genome annotation resource

Several databases were initiated at the Sanger Institute but are now hosted elsewhere:

- MEROPS, a peptidase database
- Pfam, a protein family database
- Rfam, an RNA family database
- TreeFam, a database of phylogenetic trees for animal genes
- WormBase, a database on the biology and sequence of the model organism C. elegans and other related Nematodes.
- WormBase ParaSite, a database for the genomics for parasitic helminths (both Nematodes and Platyhelminthes).

== Research ==
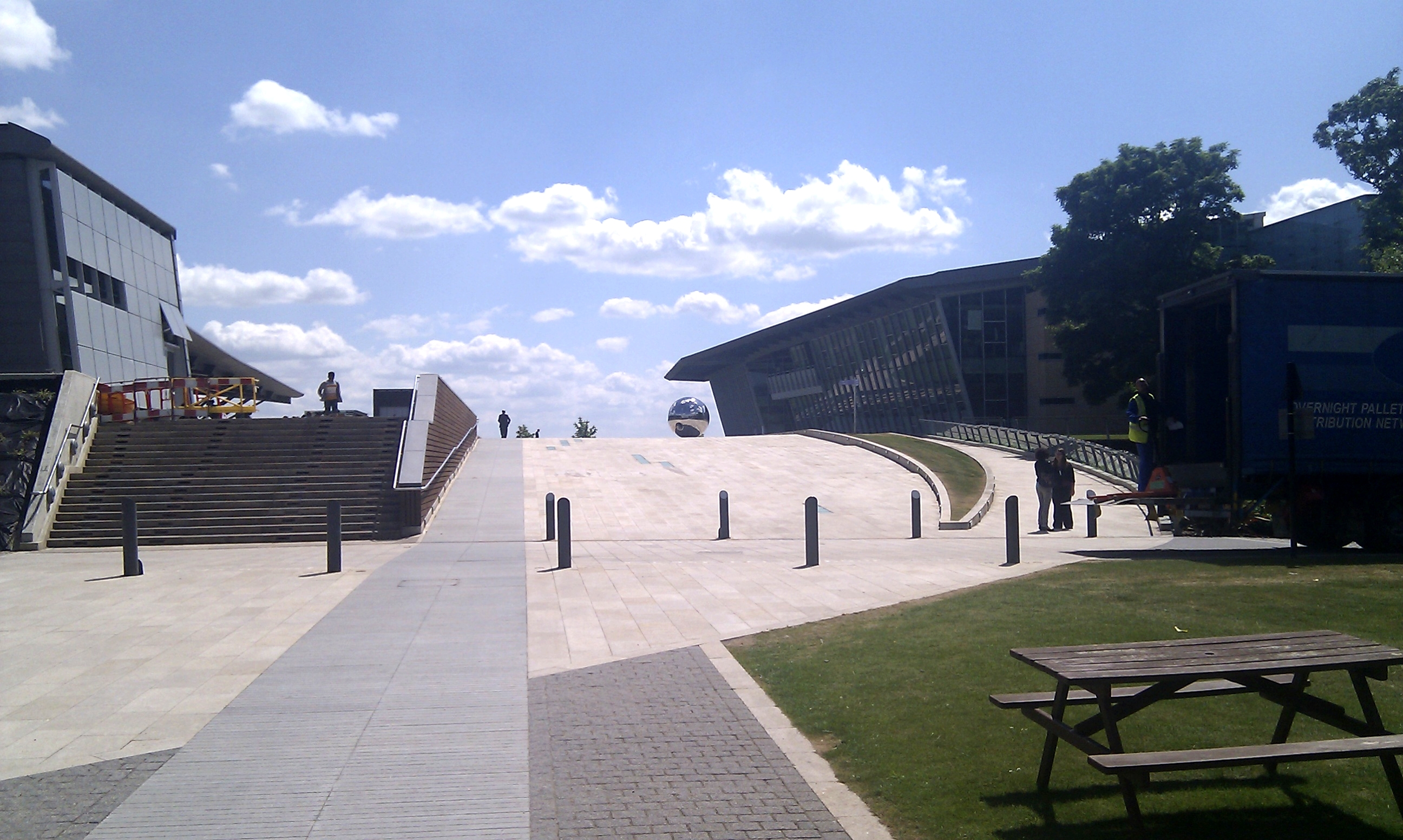
The Morgan Building (right), part of the Sanger Institute

Scientific research at the Sanger Institute is organised into five Scientific Programmes, each defining a major area of research with a particular biological, disease or analytic focus. The current Programmes at the Sanger Institute are Cancer, Ageing and Somatic Mutation, Cellular Genetics, Human Genetics, Parasites and Microbes and Tree of Life. Studies from all programmes provide insights into human, pathogen, cellular evolution, the phenotypic and hence biological consequences of genome variation and the processes which cause mutations.

=== Somatic Genomics Programme ===
Provides leadership in data aggregation and informatics innovation, develops high-throughput cellular models of cancer for genome-wide functional screens and drug testing, and explores somatic mutation's role in clonal evolution, ageing and development. This Programme includes the Cancer Genome Project.

=== Cellular Genomics Programme ===
Explores human gene function by studying the impact of genome variation on cell biology. Large-scale systematic screens are used to discover the impact of naturally occurring and engineered genome mutations in human induced pluripotent cells (hIPSCs), their differentiated derivatives and other cell types. It is one of the founder programmes driving the creation and organisation of the international Human Cell Atlas initiative.

=== Human Genetics Programme ===
The institute's research in human genetics focuses on the characterisation of human genetic variation in health and disease. Aside from the institute's contribution to the Human Genome Project, researchers at the Sanger Institute have made contributions in various research areas relating to disease, population comparative and evolutionary genetics. In January 2008, the launch of the 1000 Genomes Project, a collaboration with scientists around the globe, signalled an effort to sequence the genomes of 1000 individuals in order to create the "most detailed map of human genetic variation to support disease studies". The data from the pilot projects was made freely available in public databases in June 2010. In 2010, the Sanger Institute announced its participation in the UK10K project, which will sequence the genomes of 10,000 individuals to identify rare genetic variants and their effects on human health. The Sanger Institute is also part of the International Cancer Genome Consortium, an international effort to describe different cancer tumour types. It is also part of the GENCODE and ENCODE research programmes to create an encyclopaedia of DNA elements.

The Programme applies genomics to population-scale studies to identify the causal variants and pathways involved in human disease and their effects on cell biology. It also models developmental disorders to explore which physical aspects might be reversible.

=== Pathogens and Microbes Programme ===
Investigates the common underpinning mechanisms of evolution, infection and resistance to therapy into bolster understanding of bacteria, viruses and parasites, with a particular interest in malaria. It also explores the effects of genome variation on the biology of host–pathogen interactions, in particular host response to infection and the role of microiotia in health and disease. All the genomes after sequencing are made available at the web-based onsite-maintained database, GeneDB.

=== Generative Genomics Programme ===
Uses Sanger's computational facilities to build computational models that generate foundational datasets and enable the understanding and prediction of the outcome of altering individual nucleotides in every genome. Large-scale sequencing experiments generate datasets from which changes in DNA sequence can show alterations in RNA, proteins and cellular networks.

=== Tree of Life Programme ===
The Tree of Life Programme was created in 2019 to investigate the diversity of complex organisms found in the UK through sequencing and cellular technologies. It also compares and contrasts species' genome sequences to unlock insights into evolution and conservation. This Programme will play a leading role in the Darwin Tree of Life Project, a UK-wide initiative to sequence the genomes of all 66,000 complex species (eukaryotes) in the British Isles.

=== Collaborations ===
Much of the Sanger Institute's research is carried out in partnership with the wider scientific community; over 90 percent of the institute's research papers involve collaborations with other organisations. Significant collaborations include:

- 1000 Genomes Project
- GENCODE and ENCODE (ENCyclopedia Of DNA Elements)
- International Cancer Genome Consortium
- International HapMap Project
- International Knockout Mouse Consortium
- International Mouse Phenotyping Consortium
- SNP (Single nucleotide polymorphism) Consortium
- The Copy Number Variation Project
- The genome sequencing of S. pombe, C. elegans, mouse and the Malaria parasite.
- The Human Genome Project
- The UK 10,000 Genomes Project (UK10K)

=== Public engagement ===
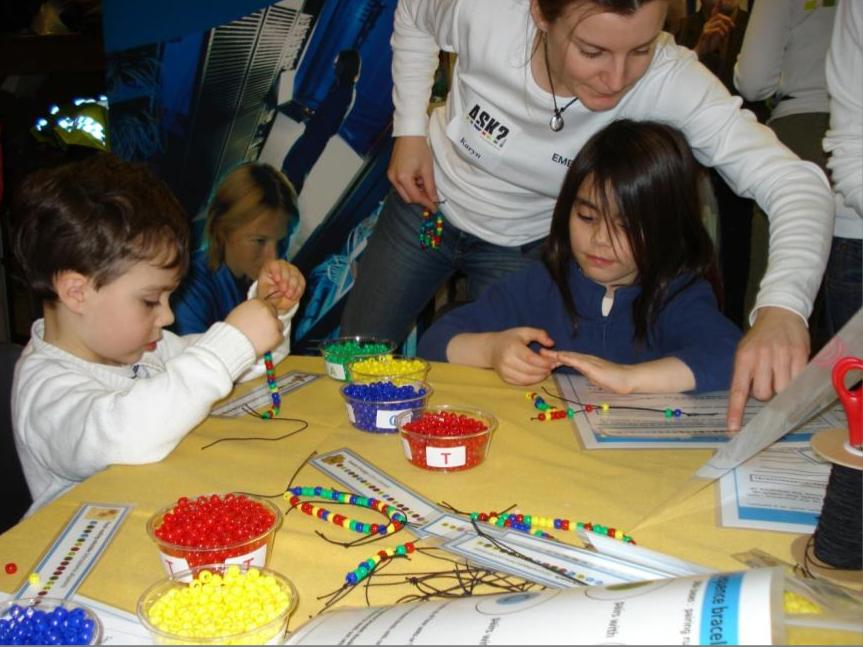
Children at a public outreach event thread bracelets in four colours to spell out a DNA sequence.

The Sanger Institute has a programme of public engagement activity. The programme aims to make complex biomedical research accessible to a range of audiences including school students and their teachers, and local community members.

The Communication and Public Engagement programme aims to "encourage informed discussion about issues relevant to Sanger Institute research" and "foster a community of researchers who can engage effectively with different audiences". The institute hosts visits for more than 1,500 students, teachers and community groups per year. Visitors may meet scientific staff, tour the institute and its facilities, and participate in ethical debates and activities. The programme also offers professional development sessions for teachers of GCSE and post 16 science through the national network of Science Learning Centres, and by hosting visits for groups interested in updating their knowledge in contemporary genetics. Videoconferencing into the Sanger Institute is also offered for Science Learning Centres, Science Centres and schools.

Scientific and public engagement staff also collaborate on and contribute to national projects such as the UK's InsideDNA traveling exhibition and the Who am I? gallery at The Science Museum. They also participate in public events such as the Cambridge Science Festival.

=== Graduate training ===
The institute operates two PhD training programmes: a four-year course for basic science graduates, and a three-year course for clinicians. The four-year course requires students to rotate around three different laboratories in order to broaden their scientific horizons before choosing a PhD project. Each student is required to choose at least one experimental and one informatics-based rotation project. The institute houses approximately 50 pre-doctoral students, all of whom are registered at the University of Cambridge.

== Officers ==
According to Companies House the five officers of the parent company Genome Research Limited are Henry Parkinson, Kay Elizabeth Davies, Rolf Dieter Heuer, James Cuthbert Smith, David Lindsay Willetts. According to the Sanger website Henry Parkinson is head of legal.

== Staff ==
As of 2023 the Sanger employs more than a thousand people, and is led by Matthew Hurles. Notable scientific staff, faculty and alumni are listed below:

=== Academic faculty ===
As of 2019 a faculty of 32 scientists lead hypothesis-driven research, seeking answers to biomedical questions. Among others, these include Dominic Kwiatkowski, Nicole Soranzo, Michael Stratton, Sarah Teichmann and Matthew Hurles. The institute also has a number of Associate Faculty members, International Fellows and Honorary Faculty. These include Adrian Bird, Ewan Birney, Chris Ponting, Fiona Powrie, Stephen O'Rahilly, Antonio Vidal-Puig, and Wolf Reik, among others.

=== Scientific advisory board ===
The Sanger Board of Management are guided by the scientific advisory board whose members include Professor David Altshuler, Professor Anton Berns, Professor David J. Lipman, Professor Kevin Marsh and Professor Sir Paul Nurse.

=== Alumni ===
Previous faculty members at the Sanger include:

- Alex Bateman, EMBL-EBI
- Tim Hubbard, Professor at King's College London
- Leena Peltonen-Palotie (1952–2010)
- Julian Rayner
- Eleftheria Zeggini
- Richard Durbin FRS

== History ==
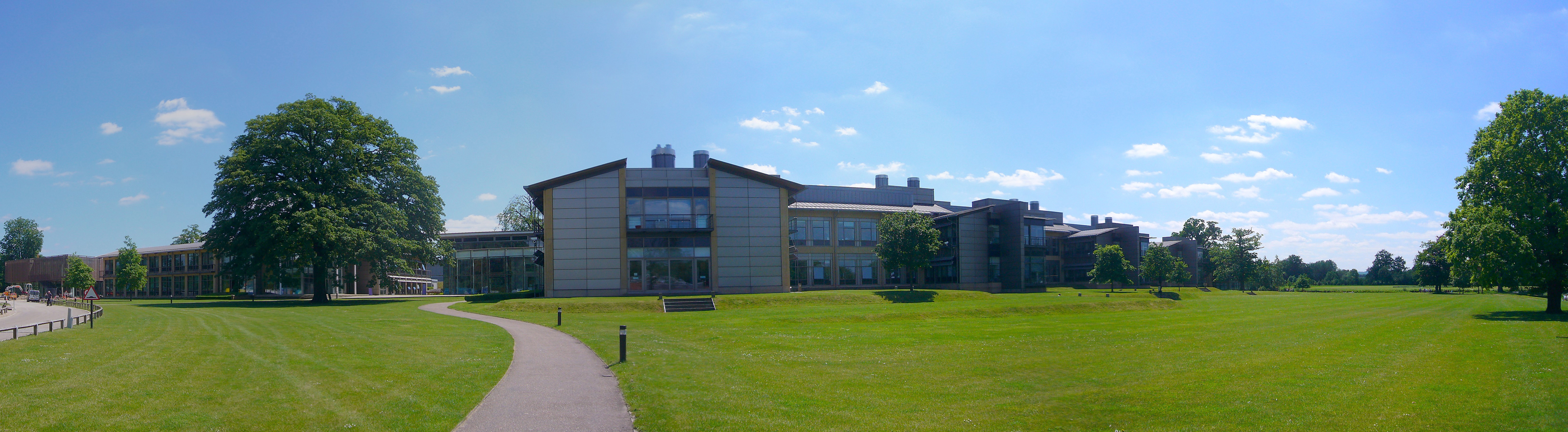
The Wellcome Trust Sanger Institute was established in 1992, funded by the Wellcome Trust and the UK's Medical Research Council.

=== Management ===
John E. Sulston was the founding director of the Sanger Institute. Sulston was instrumental in the choice of the Hinxton site for the institute and remained there as director until the announcement of the completion of the draft human genome in 2000. Sulston graduated from the University of Cambridge in 1963 and completed his PhD on the chemical synthesis of DNA in 1966. He shared the 2002 Nobel Prize in Physiology or Medicine with Robert Horvitz and Sydney Brenner, two years after standing down as director of the institute.

In 2000, Allan Bradley left his appointment as professor at the Baylor College of Medicine, in the US, to take up the position as director of the Sanger Institute. Bradley wanted to build on the achievements made by the Sanger Institute in the Human Genome Project by "concentrating on gene function, cancer genomics, and the genomes of model organisms such as the mouse and the zebrafish". Bradley received his BA, MA and PhD in genetics from the University of Cambridge.

In 2010, Bradley stepped down from his leadership role to form a startup company, but remains on the faculty of the institute as director emeritus. Mike Stratton, who is a leader of the Cancer Genome Project and the International Cancer Genome Consortium, was appointed director of the Sanger Institute in May of that year.

=== Human Genome Project ===
The Sanger Institute was opened in 1993, three years after the inception of the Human Genome Project, and went on to make the largest single contribution to the gold standard sequence of the human genome, published in 2004. The institute was engaged in collaborations to sequence 8 of the 23 human pairs of chromosomes (1, 6, 9, 10, 13, 20, 22, and X). Since the publishing of the human genome, research carried out at the institute has developed beyond sequencing of organisms into various biomedical research areas, including studies into diseases such as cancer, malaria and diabetes.

== Controversy ==
In August 2018 it was reported that an investigation was under way into allegations of bullying of staff and gender discrimination made against senior management of the Wellcome Trust Sanger Institute, including the director. The investigation, carried out by the barrister Thomas Kibling from Matrix Chambers, concluded in October 2018 and cleared Stratton of any wrongdoing, while listing areas for improvement in the workings of the Sanger Institute. The findings and the independence of the investigation were disputed.

In October 2019 it was reported that the institute had manufactured a medical tool with the intent of monetising it despite not having ethical nor legal approval to do so and having been made aware by Stellenbosch University and internal whistleblowers.
