= International Knockout Mouse Consortium =

Scientific project organization

IKMC: International Knockout Mouse Consortium

Content
- Description: International Knockout Mouse Consortium
- Organisms: Mice

Contact
- Research center: The Jackson Laboratory & The Wellcome Trust Sanger Institute
- Primary citation: Ringwald & al. (2011)
- Release date: 2010

Access
- Website: http://www.knockoutmouse.org

Miscellaneous
- License: Creative Commons Attribution 2.0

The International Knockout Mouse Consortium (IKMC) is a scientific endeavour to produce a collection of mouse embryonic stem cell lines that together lack every gene in the genome, and then to distribute the cells to scientific researchers to create knockout mice to study. Many of the targeted alleles are designed so that they can generate both complete and conditional gene knockout mice. The IKMC was initiated on March 15, 2007, at a meeting in Brussels. By 2011, Nature reported that approximately 17,000 different genes have already been disabled by the consortium, "leaving only around 3,000 more to go".

The consortium encompasses four major, high-throughput gene-targeted mutagenesis programs: the National Institutes of Health (NIH)-sponsored Knockout Mouse Program (KOMP) and state-funded Texas Institute for Genomic Medicine (TIGM) in the U.S., the North American Conditional Mouse Mutagenesis (NorCOMM) Program in Canada, and the European Conditional Mouse Mutagenesis (EUCOMM) Programme in Europe. The first of its annual meetings of members and funders, hosted by the country of its rotating chair, was held at the NIH in Bethesda, Maryland, in the United States for 2007–2008, with Toronto, Canada, hosting for 2008–2009.
