= Texas Institute for Genomic Medicine =

Research institute in Texas, USA

Texas A&M Institute for Genomic Medicine
- Established: 2005
- Focus: biotechnology
- Location: Texas

The Texas A&M Institute for Genomic Medicine (TIGM) is a research institute of Texas A&M AgriLife Research. It was founded in 2005 under a $50 million award from the Texas Enterprise Fund to accelerate the pace of medical discoveries and foster the development of the biotechnology industry in Texas.

TIGM helps researchers gain faster access to the genetically engineered knockout mice used in medical research. TIGM owns and maintains the world's largest library of embryonic stem cells for C57BL/6 mice. In addition, TIGM has contracted access to the world's largest library of genetically modified 129 mouse cells. The Institute headquarters and laboratory facilities are based on the main campus of Texas A&M University in College Station, Texas.
