= E1cB-elimination reaction =

Chemical reaction

An example of the E1cB reaction mechanism in the degradation of a hemiketal under basic conditions

The E1cB elimination reaction is a type of elimination reaction which occurs under basic conditions, where the hydrogen to be removed is relatively acidic, while the leaving group (such as -OH or -OR) is a relatively poor one. Usually a moderate to strong base is present. E1cB is a two-step process, the first step of which may or may not be reversible. First, a base abstracts the relatively acidic proton to generate a stabilized anion. The lone pair of electrons on the anion then moves to the neighboring atom, thus expelling the leaving group and forming a double or triple bond. The name of the mechanism - E1cB - stands for Elimination Unimolecular conjugate Base. Elimination refers to the fact that the mechanism is an elimination reaction and will lose two substituents. Unimolecular refers to the fact that the rate-determining step of this reaction only involves one molecular entity. Finally, conjugate base refers to the formation of the carbanion intermediate, which is the conjugate base of the starting material.

E1cB should be thought of as being on one end of a continuous spectrum, which includes the E1 mechanism at the opposite end and the E2 mechanism in the middle. The E1 mechanism usually has the opposite characteristics: the leaving group is a good one (like -OTs or -Br), while the hydrogen is not particularly acidic and a strong base is absent. Thus, in the E1 mechanism, the leaving group leaves first to generate a carbocation. Due to the presence of an empty p orbital after departure of the leaving group, the hydrogen on the neighboring carbon becomes much more acidic, allowing it to then be removed by the weak base in the second step. In an E2 reaction, the presence of a strong base and a good leaving group allows proton abstraction by the base and the departure of the leaving group to occur simultaneously, leading to a concerted transition state in a one-step process.

== Mechanism ==
α and β assignments in a molecule with leaving group, LG

There are two main requirements to have a reaction proceed down an E1cB mechanistic pathway. The compound must have an acidic hydrogen on its β-carbon and a relatively poor leaving group on the α- carbon. The first step of an E1cB mechanism is the deprotonation of the β-carbon, resulting in the formation of an anionic intermediate, such as a carbanion. The greater the stability of this intermediate, the more the mechanism will favor an E1cB mechanism. This intermediate can be stabilized through induction or delocalization of the electron lone pair through resonance. In general it can be claimed that an electron withdrawing group on the substrate, a strong base, a poor leaving group and a polar solvent triggers the E1cB mechanism. An example of an E1cB mechanism that has a stable intermediate can be seen in the degradation of ethiofencarb - a carbamate insecticide that has a relatively short half-life in Earth's atmosphere. Upon deprotonation of the amine, the resulting amide is relatively stable because it is conjugated with the neighboring carbonyl. In addition to containing an acidic hydrogen on the β-carbon, a relatively poor leaving group is also necessary. A bad leaving group is necessary because a good leaving group will leave before the ionization of the molecule. As a result, the compound will likely proceed through an E2 pathway. Some examples of compounds that contain poor leaving groups and can undergo the E1cB mechanism are alcohols and fluoroalkanes. It has also been suggested that the E1cB mechanism is more common among alkenes eliminating to alkynes than from an alkane to alkene. One possible explanation for this is that the sp^{2} hybridization creates slightly more acidic protons. Although this mechanism is not limited to carbon-based eliminations. It has been observed with other heteroatoms, such as nitrogen in the elimination of a phenol derivative from ethiofencarb.

Degradation of ethiofencarb illustrating the presence of a stable anion due to resonance between the amide functional group and the carbonyl group.

== Distinguishing E1cB-elimination reactions from E1- and E2-elimination reactions ==
All elimination reactions involve the removal of two substituents from a pair of atoms in a compound. Alkene, alkynes, or similar heteroatom variations (such as carbonyl and cyano) will form. The E1cB mechanism is just one of three types of elimination reaction. The other two elimination reactions are E1 and E2 reactions. Although the mechanisms are similar, they vary in the timing of the deprotonation of the α-carbon and the loss of the leaving group. E1 stands for unimolecular elimination, and E2 stands for bimolecular elimination. In an E1 mechanism, the molecule contains a good leaving group that departs before deprotonation of the α-carbon. This results in the formation of a carbocation intermediate. The carbocation is then deprotonated resulting in the formation of a new pi bond. The molecule involved must also have a very good leaving group such as bromine or chlorine, and it should have a relatively less acidic α-carbon.

Example of the preferential elimination of fluorine in an E1cB-elimination reaction.

In an E2-elimination reaction, both the deprotonation of the β-carbon and the loss of the leaving group occur simultaneously in one concerted step. Molecules that undergo E2-elimination mechanisms have more acidic β-carbons than those that undergo E1 mechanisms, but their β-carbons are not as acidic as those of molecules that undergo E1cB mechanisms. The key difference between the E2 vs E1cb pathways is a distinct carbanion intermediate as opposed to one concerted mechanism. Studies have been shown that the pathways differ by using different halogen leaving groups. One example uses chlorine as a better stabilizing halogen for the anion than fluorine, which makes fluorine the leaving group even though chlorine is a much better leaving group. This provides evidence that the carbanion is formed because the products are not possible through the most stable concerted E2 mechanism. The following table summarizes the key differences between the three elimination reactions; however, the best way to identify which mechanism is playing a key role in a particular reaction involves the application of chemical kinetics.

E1	E2	E1cB
Stepwise reaction	Concerted reaction	Stepwise reaction
Carbocation intermediate	Simultaneous removal of proton, formation of double bond, and loss of leaving group	Carbanion intermediate
Strongly acidic media	No preference	Strongly basic media
Good leaving groups	Leaving group	Poor leaving groups
Less acidic B-H	Acidic B-H	More acidic B-H

== Chemical kinetics of E1cB-elimination mechanisms ==
When trying to determine whether or not a reaction follows the E1cB mechanism, chemical kinetics are essential. The best way to identify the E1cB mechanism involves the use of rate laws and the kinetic isotope effect. These techniques can also help further differentiate between E1cB, E1, and E2-elimination reactions.

=== Rate law ===
When trying to experimentally determine whether or not a reaction follows the E1cB mechanism, chemical kinetics are essential. The best ways to identify the E1cB mechanism involves the use of rate laws and the kinetic isotope effect.

The rate law that governs E1cB mechanisms is relatively simple to determine. Consider the following reaction scheme.

An example of an E1cB-elimination mechanism with a generic leaving group (LG), and ethoxide as the base.

Assuming that there is a steady-state carbanion concentration in the mechanism, the rate law for an E1cB mechanism.

$$\begin{align}
\frac\ce{d[P]}{\ce d t} &= \frac{k_1 k_2 \ce{[substrate][base]}}{k_{-1}[\ce{conjugate\ acid}]+k_2} \\
\ce{rate} &= k_\ce{obs}\ce{[substrate][base]}
\end{align}$$

From this equation, it is clear the second order kinetics will be exhibited. E1cB mechanisms kinetics can vary slightly based on the rate of each step. As a result, the E1cB mechanism can be broken down into three categories:

1. E1cB_{anion} is when the carbanion is stable and/or a strong base is used in excess of the substrate, making deprotonation irreversible, followed by rate-determining loss of the leaving group (k_{1}[base] ≫ k_{2}).
2. E1cB_{rev} is when the first step is reversible but the formation of product is slower than reforming the starting material, this again results from a slow second step (k_{−1}[conjugate acid] ≫ k_{2}).
3. E1cB_{irr} is when the first step is slow, but once the anion is formed the product quickly follows (k_{2} ≫ k_{−1}[conjugate acid]). This leads to an irreversible first step but unlike E1cB_{anion}, deprotonation is rate determining.

=== Kinetic isotope effect ===
==== Deuterium ====
Deuterium exchange and a deuterium kinetic isotope effect can help distinguish among E1cB_{rev}, E1cB_{anion}, and E1cB_{irr}. If the solvent is protic and contains deuterium in place of hydrogen (e.g., CH_{3}OD), then the exchange of protons into the starting material can be monitored. If the recovered starting material contains deuterium, then the reaction is most likely undergoing an E1cB_{rev} type mechanism. Recall, in this mechanism protonation of the carbanion (either by the conjugate acid or by solvent) is faster than loss of the leaving group. This means after the carbanion is formed, it will quickly remove a proton from the solvent to form the starting material.
If the reactant contains deuterium at the β position, a primary kinetic isotope effect indicates that deprotonation is rate determining. Of the three E1cB mechanisms, this result is only consistent with the E1cB_{irr} mechanism, since the isotope is already removed in E1cB_{anion} and leaving group departure is rate determining in E1cB_{rev}.

==== Fluorine-19 and carbon-11 ====
Another way that the kinetic isotope effect can help distinguish E1cB mechanisms involves the use of ^{19}F. Fluorine is a relatively poor leaving group, and it is often employed in E1cB mechanisms. Fluorine kinetic isotope effects are also applied in the labeling of Radiopharmaceuticals and other compounds in medical research. This experiment is very useful in determining whether or not the loss of the leaving group is the rate-determining step in the mechanism and can help distinguish between E1cB_{irr} and E2 mechanisms. ^{11}C can also be used to probe the nature of the transition state structure. The use of ^{11}C can be used to study the formation of the carbanion as well as study its lifetime which can not only show that the reaction is a two-step E1cB mechanism (as opposed to the concerted E2 mechanism), but it can also address the lifetime and stability of the transition state structure which can further distinguish between the three different types of E1cB mechanisms.

== Aldol reactions ==
The most well known reaction that undergoes E1cB elimination is the aldol condensation reaction under basic conditions. This involves the deprotonation of a compound containing a carbonyl group that results in the formation of an enolate. The enolate is the very stable conjugate base of the starting material, and is one of the intermediates in the reaction. This enolate then acts as a nucleophile and can attack an electrophilic aldehyde. The Aldol product is then deprotonated forming another enolate followed by the elimination of water in an E1cB dehydration reaction. Aldol reactions are a key reaction in organic chemistry because they provide a means of forming carbon-carbon bonds, allowing for the synthesis of more complex molecules.

An aldol condensation reaction is one of the most common examples of an E1cB mechanism.

== Photo-induced E1cB ==
A photochemical version of E1cB has been reported by Lukeman et al. In this report, a photochemically induced decarboxylation reaction generates a carbanion intermediate, which subsequently eliminates the leaving group. The reaction is unique from other forms of E1cB since it does not require a base to generate the carbanion. The carbanion formation step is irreversible, and should thus be classified as E1cB_{irr}.

E1cB reaction mechanism through photo-induced decarboxylation.

== In biology ==
The E1cB-elimination reaction is an important reaction in biology. For example, the penultimate step of glycolysis involves an E1cB mechanism. This step involves the conversion of 2-phosphoglycerate to phosphoenolpyruvate, facilitated by the enzyme enolase.

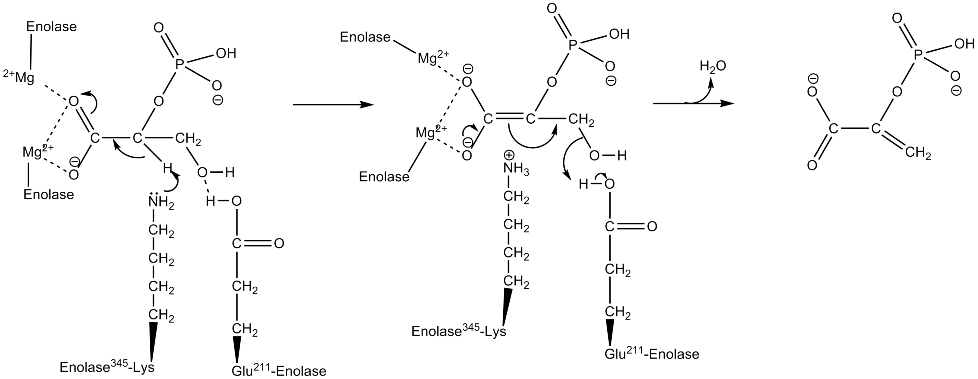
Mechanism of enolase. In the first step, lysine abstracts a proton. In the second step, a hydroxide group leaves.

== See also ==
- Elimination reaction
- Reaction mechanism
- Carbocation
- Carbanion
