= Phosphoglycerate phosphatase =

Class of enzymes

phosphoglycerate phosphatase

Identifiers
- EC no.: 3.1.3.20
- CAS no.: 9055-30-5

Databases
- BRENDA: enzyme data
- ExPASy: NiceZyme view
- KEGG: enzyme entry
- MetaCyc: metabolic pathway
- Rhea: reactions
- PDB structures: RCSB PDB PDBe PDBsum
- Gene Ontology: AmiGO / QuickGO
Search
- PMC: articles
- PubMed: articles
- NCBI: proteins

The enzyme phosphoglycerate phosphatase (EC 3.1.3.20) catalyzes the reaction

2-phospho-D-glyceric acid
H_{2}O
P_{i}
D-glyceric acid

The enzyme characterised from beef liver hydrolyses 2-phospho-D-glyceric acid to D-glyceric acid and orthophosphate.

This enzyme is a hydrolase, specifically one acting on phosphoric monoester bonds. The systematic name is D-glycerate-2-phosphate phosphohydrolase. Other names in use include D-2-phosphoglycerate phosphatase, and glycerophosphate phosphatase.
