= SEDT =

SEDT is an initialism that may refer to:

- School of Entertainment and Design Technology at Miami Dade College
- School of Environmental Development Technology at Federal Polytechnic, Nekede
- sedt, a Unix text editor based on EDT (Digital)
- Sequential Euclidean distance transform, a distance transform using Euclidean distance, computed sequentially
- Single-ended double truck, a configuration of train rolling stock used for instance in the Toronto Suburban Railway
- Spondyloepiphyseal dysplasia tarda, a rare skeletal disease associated with the TRAPPC2 gene
