= CGAP =

CGAP may refer to:

- Cancer Genome Anatomy Project, with the goal of documenting sequences of RNA transcripts
- Consultative Group to Assist the Poor, a partnership of organizations at the World Bank
