= ENO3 =

Protein-coding gene in the species Homo sapiens

Identifiers
- Aliases: ENO3, GSD13, MSE, enolase 3
- External IDs: OMIM: 131370; MGI: 95395; GeneCards: ENO3
Available structures
PDB	Ortholog search: PDBe RCSB
PDB	List of PDB id codes 2XSX
Enzyme activity
EC #	BRENDA	ExPASy	KEGG	MetaCyc
4.2.1.11	↗	↗	↗	↗

Gene location (Human)
Chr.	Chromosome 17 (human)
Band	17p13.2	Start	4,948,092 bp
Band	17p13.2	End	4,957,131 bp

Gene location (Mouse)
Chr.	Chromosome 11 (mouse)
Band	11 B3|11 43.21 cM	Start	70,548,028 bp
Band	11 B3|11 43.21 cM	End	70,553,339 bp
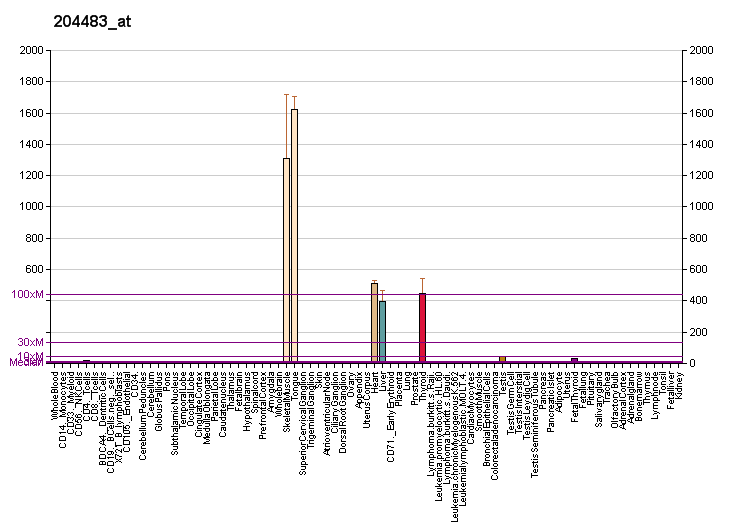
RNA expression pattern
Bgee	Human / Mouse (ortholog); Top expressed in: Skeletal muscle tissue of rectus abdominis; biceps brachii; Skeletal muscle tissue of biceps brachii; muscle of thigh; triceps brachii muscle; glutes; thoracic diaphragm; apex of heart; body of tongue; gastrocnemius muscle / Top expressed in: sternocleidomastoid muscle; triceps brachii muscle; temporal muscle; digastric muscle; vastus lateralis muscle; tibialis anterior muscle; ankle; gastrocnemius muscle; medial head of gastrocnemius muscle; extensor digitorum longus muscle; More reference expression data
BioGPS	More reference expression data
Gene ontology
Molecular function	phosphopyruvate hydratase activity; metal ion binding; lyase activity; magnesium ion binding; protein homodimerization activity; protein heterodimerization activity
Cellular component	plasma membrane; phosphopyruvate hydratase complex; extracellular exosome; extracellular space; cytoplasm; cytosol; membrane
Biological process	gluconeogenesis; glycolytic process; canonical glycolysis; ageing; skeletal muscle tissue regeneration; substantia nigra development
Sources:Amigo / QuickGO
Orthologs
Databases	NCBI: entry; OMA: entry
Species	Human	Mouse
Entrez	2027	13808
Ensembl	ENSG00000108515	ENSMUSG00000060600
UniProt	P13929	P21550
RefSeq (mRNA)	NM_001193503; NM_001976; NM_053013; NM_001374523; NM_001374524	NM_001136062; NM_001276285; NM_007933
RefSeq (protein)	NP_001180432; NP_001967; NP_443739; NP_001361452; NP_001361453	NP_001129534; NP_001263214; NP_031959
Location (UCSC)	Chr 17: 4.95 – 4.96 Mb	Chr 11: 70.55 – 70.55 Mb
PubMed search
- Wikidata
View/Edit Human	View/Edit Mouse

Enolase 3 (ENO3), more commonly known as beta-enolase (ENO-β), is an enzyme that in humans is encoded by the ENO3 gene.

This gene encodes one of the three enolase isoenzymes found in mammals. This isoenzyme is found in skeletal muscle cells in the adult where it may play a role in muscle development and regeneration. A switch from alpha enolase to beta enolase occurs in muscle tissue during development in rodents. Mutations in this gene have been associated with glycogen storage disease. Alternatively spliced transcript variants encoding different isoforms have been described.[provided by RefSeq, Jul 2010]

== Structure ==
ENO3 is one of three enolase isoforms, the other two being ENO1 (ENO-α) and ENO2 (ENO-γ). Each isoform is a protein subunit that can form hetero- or homodimers of the following combinations: αα, αβ, αγ, ββ, and γγ.

=== Gene ===
The ENO3 gene spans 6 kb and contains 12 exons, though the first exon is an untranslated region and, thus, non-coding. This first intron, along with the 5'-flanking region, contains a consensus sequence for muscle-specific regulatory factors that includes a CC(A + T-rich)6GG box, a M-CAT-box CAATCCT, and two myocyte-specific enhancer-binding factor 1 boxes. Upstream of the first exon lies a TATA-like box and CpG-rich region, which contains recognition motifs for binding transcriptional regulatory factors such as Sp1, activator protein 1 and 2, CCAAT box transcription factor/nuclear factor I, and cyclic AMP. Unlike the other enolase genes, which possess multiple transcription initiation sites, ENO3 possesses a single initiation site located 26 bp downstream of the TATA-like box.

=== Protein ===
This gene encodes a 433-residue dimeric protein. Due to its comparatively small length and highly conserved intron/exon organization among the three enolase isoforms, ENO3 is suggested to have been the last to diverge from a common ancestral gene.

== Function ==
As an enolase, ENO3 is a glycolytic enzyme that catalyzes the reversible conversion of 2-phosphoglycerate to phosphoenolpyruvate. This particular isoform is predominantly expressed in adult striated muscle, including skeletal and cardiac muscle. During fetal muscle development, there is a transcriptional switch from expressing ENO1 to ENO3 influenced by muscle innervation and Myo D1. ENO3 is expressed at higher levels in fast-twitch fibers than in slow-twitch fibers.

== Clinical significance ==
ENO3 has been associated with energy metabolism in cancer cells. TFG-TEC, an oncoprotein, activates ENO3 expression by altering the chromatin structure of the ENO3 promoter and increasing the acetylation of histone H3.

Muscle β-enolase deficiency (glycogen storage disease type XIII) is a rare inherited metabolic myopathy caused by a defect in the enzyme's active site, thus disrupting its glycolytic activity. Though this deficiency is characterized as an autosomal recessive condition, both heterozygous and homozygous mutations were identified in the ENO3 gene. The heterozygous mutations were linked to milder symptoms while the homozygous mutations tended to produce more severe symptoms, including rhabdomyolysis. Advances in genetic testing, such as exome sequencing and specific gene panels, can provide greater access to diagnoses for muscle β-enolase deficiency and other rare disorders.

== Interactions ==
TFG-TEC binds to the proximal promoter region of the ENO3 gene.

== Interactive pathway map ==
Click on genes, proteins and metabolites below to link to respective articles. (Note: The interactive pathway map can be edited at WikiPathways: "GlycolysisGluconeogenesis_WP534".)

Glycolysis and Gluconeogenesis edit

== See also ==
- Enolase
- Alpha-enolase
- ENO2
