= C3H7O7P =

The molecular formula C_{3}H_{7}O_{7}P (molar mass: 186.06 g/mol, exact mass: 185.9929 u) may refer to:

- 2-Phosphoglyceric acid, or 2-phosphoglycerate
- 3-Phosphoglyceric acid
