= Hashimoto's encephalopathy =

Autoimmunity-associated encephalopathy

- Other names: Steroid-responsive encephalopathy associated with autoimmune thyroiditis (SREAT), encephalopathy associated with autoimmune thyroid disease (EAATD)
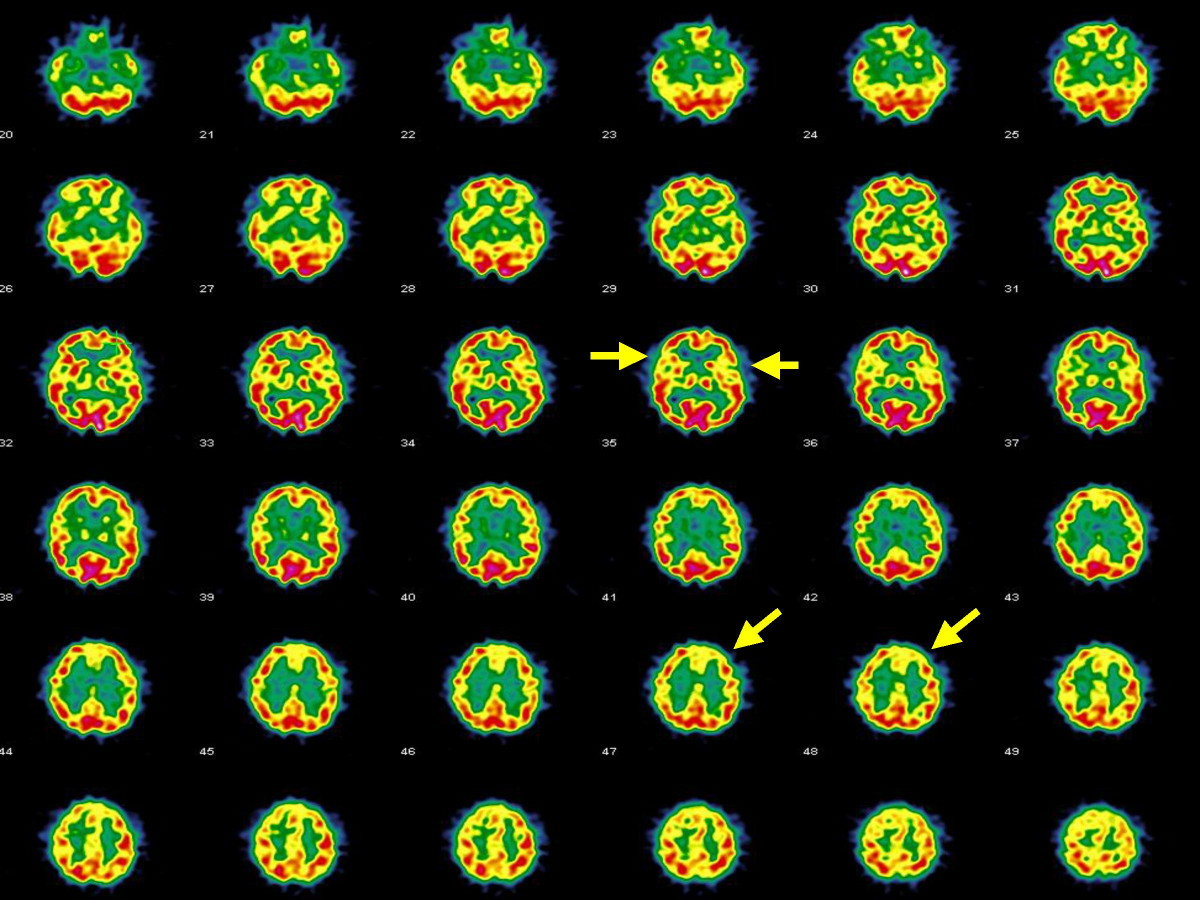
- Brain SPECT transaxial images of a patient afflicted with Hashimoto's encephalopathy showing cerebral hypoperfusion in the left frontal lobe and in both temporal lobes (arrows).
- Specialty: Neurology
- Frequency: 0.0001%

Hashimoto's encephalopathy, also known as steroid-responsive encephalopathy associated with autoimmune thyroiditis (SREAT), is a neurological condition characterized by encephalopathy, thyroid autoimmunity, and good clinical response to corticosteroids. It is associated with Hashimoto's thyroiditis, and was first described in 1966. It is sometimes referred to as a neuroendocrine disorder, although the condition's relationship to the endocrine system is widely disputed. It is recognized as a rare disease by the NIH Genetic and Rare Diseases Information Center.

Up to 2005, almost 200 case reports of this disease were published. Between 1990 and 2000, 43 cases were published. Since that time, research has expanded and numerous cases are being reported by scientists around the world, suggesting that this rare condition is likely to have been significantly undiagnosed in the past. Over 100 scientific articles on Hashimoto's encephalopathy were published between 2000 and 2013.

== Signs and symptoms ==
The onset of symptoms tends to be fairly gradual and to occur over 1–12 years.

Symptoms of Hashimoto's encephalopathy may include:

- Personality changes
- Aggression
- Delusional behavior
- Concentration and memory problems
- Coma
- Disorientation
- Headaches
- Jerks in the muscles (myoclonus – 65% of cases)
- Lack of coordination (ataxia – 65% of cases)
- Partial paralysis on the right side
- Psychosis
- Seizures (60% of cases)
- Sleep abnormalities (55% of cases)
- Speech problems (transient aphasia – 80% of cases)
- Status epilepticus (20% of cases)
- Tremors (80% of cases)

== Pathogenesis ==
The mechanism of pathogenesis is not known, but is thought to be an autoimmune disorder, similar to Hashimoto's thyroiditis, as its name suggests.

Consistent with this hypothesis, autoantibodies to alpha-enolase have been found to be associated with Hashimoto's encephalopathy. Since enolase is the penultimate step in glycolysis, if it were inhibited (for example by being bound by autoantibodies), one would expect decreased energy production by each cell, leading to resulting atrophy of the affected organ.

This would occur most likely through each cell shrinking in size in response to the energy deficit (and/or in extreme situations from some cells dying via either apoptosis or necrosis, depending on location). This may occur as a result of enough ATP not being available to maintain cellular functions - notably, failure of the Na/K ATPase, resulting in a loss of the gradient to drive the Na/Ca antiporter, which normally keeps Ca^{+}_{2} out of cells so it does not build to toxic levels that will rupture cell lysosomes leading to apoptosis. An additional feature of a low-energy state is failure to maintain axonal transport via dynein/kinesin ATPases, which in many diseases results in neuronal injury to both the brain and/or periphery.

=== Pathology ===
Very little is known about the pathology of Hashimoto's encephalopathy. Autopsies of some individuals have shown lymphocytic vasculitis of venules and veins in the brainstem and a diffuse gliosis involving gray matter more than white matter.

As mentioned above, autoantibodies to alpha-enolase associated with Hashimoto's encephalopathy have thus far been the most hypothesized mechanism of injury.

== Diagnosis ==
=== Laboratory and radiological findings ===
- Increased liver enzyme levels (55% cases)
- Increased thyroid-stimulating hormone (55% cases)
- Increased erythrocyte sedimentation rate (25% cases)

Cerebrospinal fluid findings:

- Raised protein (25% cases)
- Negative for 14–3–3 protein
- May contain antithyroid antibodies
- Magnetic resonance imaging abnormalities consistent with encephalopathy (26% of cases)
- Single photon emission computed tomography shows focal and global hypoperfusion (75% of cases)
- Cerebral angiography is normal

Thyroid hormone abnormalities are common (>80% of cases):

- Subclinical hypothyroidism (35% of cases)
- Overt hypothyroidism (20% of cases)
- Hyperthyroidism (5% of cases)
- Euthyroid on levothyroxine (10% of cases)
- Euthyroid not on levothyroxine (20% of cases)

Thyroid antibodies – both antithyroid peroxidase antibodies (anti-TPO, antithyroid microsomal antibodies, anti-M) and antithyroglobulin antibodies (anti-Tg) – in the disease are elevated, but their levels do not correlate with the severity.

Electroencephalogram studies, while almost always abnormal (98% of cases), are usually not diagnostic. The most common findings are diffuse or generalized slowing or frontal intermittent rhythmic delta activity. Prominent triphasic waves, focal slowing, epileptiform abnormalities, and photoparoxysmal and photomyogenic responses may be seen.

A study from 2006 suggested the following diagnostic criteria:

1. Encephalopathy with cognitive impairment and at least one of the following features:
  - neuropsychiatric symptoms (e.g. hallucination, delusion or paranoia)
  - Myoclonus, generalised tonic-clonic or partial seizures
  - focal-neurological deficits
2. Elevated titres of thyroid tissue antibodies (TPO-ab or microsomal)
3. Euthyroidism (potentially achieved by treatment with L-T4 or L-T3) or mild hypothyroidism with TSH concentration below 20 mIU/L
4. No evidence for infectious, toxic, metabolic or neoplastic processes in blood, urine or CSF analyses
5. No serological evidence for neuronal antibodies (e.g. voltage-gated calcium channel, voltage-gated potassium channel, or other currently recognized paraneoplastic antibodies) to support another diagnosis
6. In imaging studies no evidence for vascular, neoplastic or structural lesions that might explain the symptoms
7. Complete or nearly complete remission after initiation of glucocorticoid therapy.

=== Definition ===
A relapsing encephalopathy occurs in association with autoimmune (Hashimoto's or Ord's thyroiditis), with high titers of antithyroid antibodies. Clinically, the condition may present one or more symptoms. Onset is often gradual and may go unnoticed by the patient and close associates to the patients. Symptoms sometimes resolve themselves within days to weeks, leaving a patient undiagnosed. For many other patients, the condition may result in ongoing problems with a variety of manifestations, often confusing clinicians due to the diffuse nature of symptoms.

=== Differential diagnosis ===
- Alzheimer's disease
- Cerebrovascular accidents (stroke)
- Creutzfeldt–Jakob disease
- Epilepsy
- Migraine (including basilar, hemiplegic, and retinal types)
- Other forms of autoimmune encephalitis, including forms of limbic encephalitis such as anti-NMDA receptor encephalitis
- Schizophrenia
- Spontaneous cerebrospinal fluid leak
- Viral encephalitis
- Transient ischemic attack

== Treatment ==
Because most patients respond to corticosteroids or immunosuppressant treatment, this condition is now also referred to as steroid-responsive encephalopathy.

Initial treatment is usually with oral prednisone (50–150 mg/day) or high-dose intravenous methylprednisolone (1 g/day) for 3–7 days. Thyroid hormone treatment is also included if required. Failure of some patients to respond to this first-line treatment has produced a variety of alternative treatments, including azathioprine, cyclophosphamide, chloroquine, methotrexate, periodic intravenous immunoglobulin, and plasma exchange. No controlled trials have been conducted, so the optimal treatment is not known.

Seizures, if present, are controlled with typical antiepileptic agents.

== Prognosis ==
Duration of treatment is usually between 2 and 25 years. Earlier reports suggested that 90% of cases stay in remission after discontinuation of treatment, but this is at odds with more recent studies, which suggest that relapse commonly occurs after initial high-dose steroid treatment. Left untreated, this condition can result in coma and death.

== Epidemiology ==
The prevalence has been estimated to be 2.1/100,000 with a male-to-female ratio of 1:4. The mean age of onset is 44 with 20% of cases presenting before the age of 18 years. Most reported cases occur during the patient's fifth decade of life.

== History ==
The first case of HE was described by Brain et al. in 1966. The patient was a 48-year-old man with hypothyroidism, multiple episodes of encephalopathy, stroke-like symptoms, and Hashimoto's thyroiditis confirmed by elevated antithyroid antibodies.
