= MAST2 =

Protein-coding gene in humans

Identifiers
- Aliases: MAST2, MAST205, MTSSK, microtubule associated serine/threonine kinase 2
- External IDs: OMIM: 612257; MGI: 894676; GeneCards: MAST2
Available structures
PDB	Ortholog search: PDBe RCSB
PDB	List of PDB id codes 2KQF, 2KYL
Enzyme activity
EC #	BRENDA	ExPASy	KEGG	MetaCyc
2.7.11.1	↗	↗	↗	↗

Gene location (Human)
Chr.	Chromosome 1 (human)
Band	1p34.1	Start	45,786,987 bp
Band	1p34.1	End	46,036,122 bp

Gene location (Mouse)
Chr.	Chromosome 4 (mouse)
Band	4|4 D1	Start	116,306,762 bp
Band	4|4 D1	End	116,464,183 bp
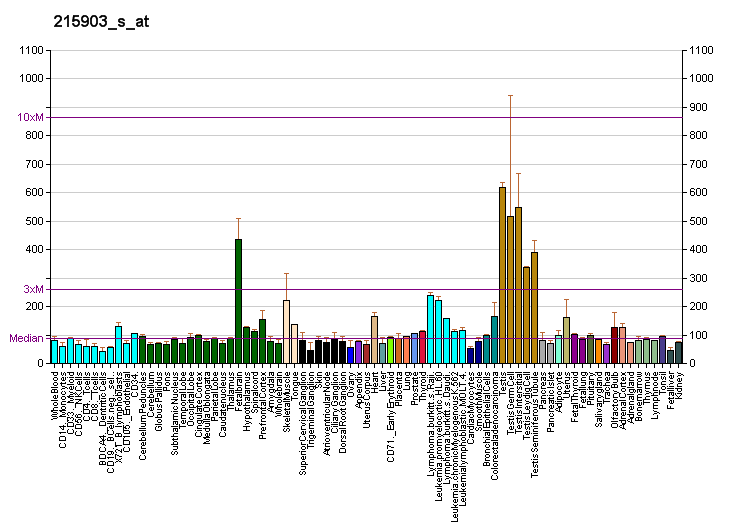

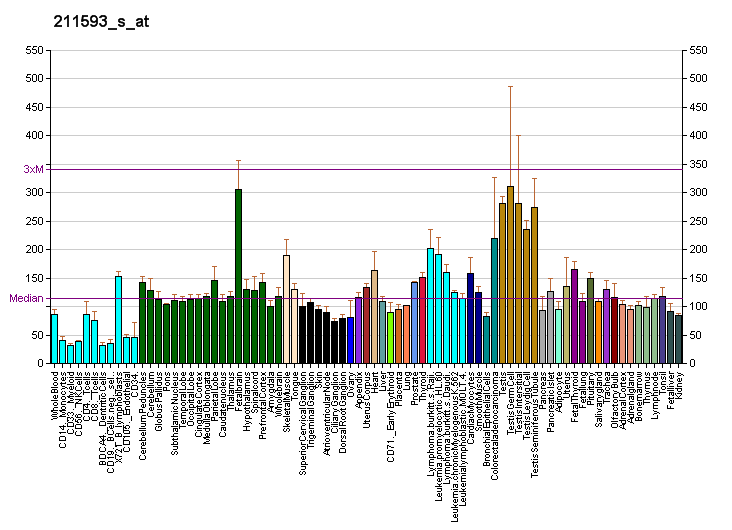

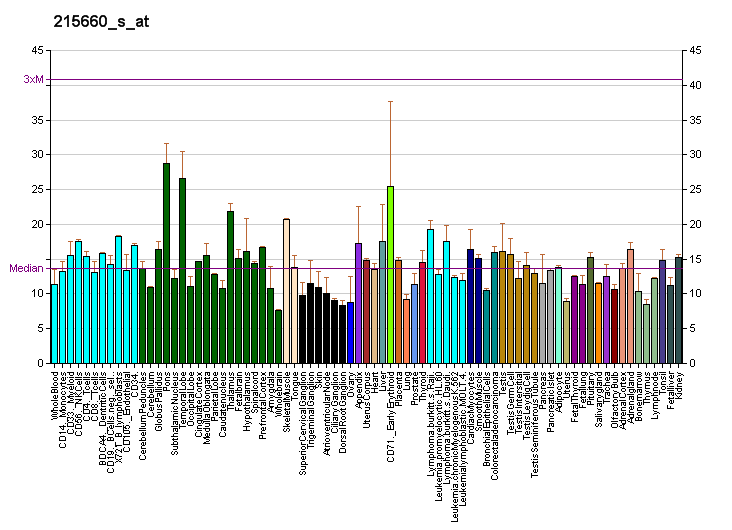
RNA expression pattern
Bgee	Human / Mouse (ortholog); Top expressed in: gastrocnemius muscle; muscle of thigh; apex of heart; gastric mucosa; glutes; stromal cell of endometrium; pancreatic ductal cell; skeletal muscle tissue; left ventricle; left testis / Top expressed in: neural layer of retina; muscle of thigh; internal carotid artery; right ventricle; ankle joint; cardiac muscle tissue of left ventricle; external carotid artery; ankle; digastric muscle; soleus muscle; More reference expression data
BioGPS	More reference expression data
Gene ontology
Molecular function	transferase activity; nucleotide binding; protein kinase activity; phosphatase binding; microtubule binding; metal ion binding; kinase activity; protein serine/threonine kinase activity; protein binding; ATP binding; magnesium ion binding
Cellular component	membrane; microtubule cytoskeleton; plasma membrane; cytoskeleton; cytoplasm
Biological process	intracellular signal transduction; phosphorylation; spermatid differentiation; protein phosphorylation; cytoskeleton organization; peptidyl-serine phosphorylation
Sources:Amigo / QuickGO
Orthologs
Databases	NCBI: entry; OMA: entry
Species	Human	Mouse
Entrez	23139	17776
Ensembl	ENSG00000086015	ENSMUSG00000003810
UniProt	Q6P0Q8	Q60592
RefSeq (mRNA)	NM_015112; NM_001319245; NM_001324320; NM_001324321	NM_001042743; NM_008641; NM_001369061; NM_001369062
RefSeq (protein)	NP_001306174; NP_001311249; NP_001311250; NP_055927	NP_001036208; NP_032667; NP_001355990; NP_001355991
Location (UCSC)	Chr 1: 45.79 – 46.04 Mb	Chr 4: 116.31 – 116.46 Mb
PubMed search
- Wikidata
View/Edit Human	View/Edit Mouse

Microtubule-associated serine/threonine-protein kinase 2 is an enzyme that in humans is encoded by the MAST2 gene. The protein encoded by this gene controls TRAF6 and NF-kappaB activity.

== Interactions ==
MAST2 has been shown to interact with PCLKC.
