= CDHR2 =

Protein-coding gene in the species Homo sapiens

Identifiers
- Aliases: CDHR2, PCDH24, PCLKC, cadherin related family member 2, PCLCK
- External IDs: MGI: 2687323; GeneCards: CDHR2

Gene location (Human)
Chr.	Chromosome 5 (human)
Band	5q35.2	Start	176,542,511 bp
Band	5q35.2	End	176,595,974 bp

Gene location (Mouse)
Chr.	Chromosome 13 (mouse)
Band	13|13 B1	Start	54,849,274 bp
Band	13|13 B1	End	54,884,475 bp
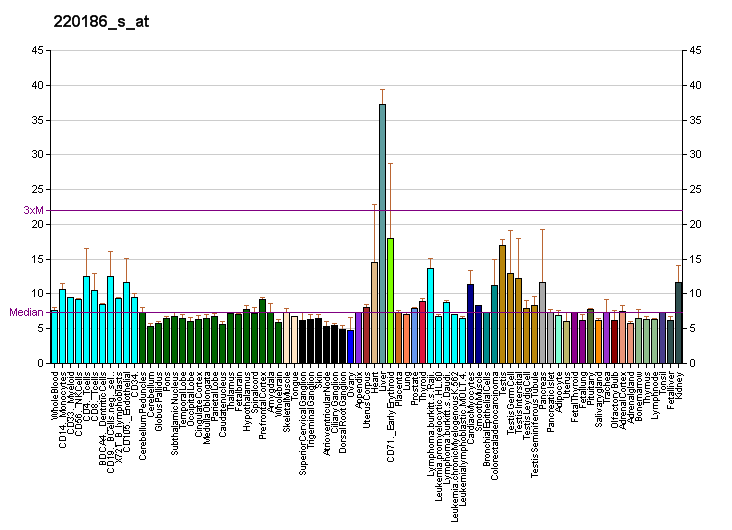
RNA expression pattern
Bgee	Human / Mouse (ortholog); Top expressed in: jejunal mucosa; mucosa of ileum; duodenum; mucosa of transverse colon; rectum; left testis; right lobe of liver; sperm; right testis; mucosa of sigmoid colon / Top expressed in: jejunum; ileum; duodenum; epithelium of small intestine; colon; left colon; Paneth cell; yolk sac; right kidney; human kidney; More reference expression data
BioGPS	More reference expression data
Gene ontology
Molecular function	calcium ion binding; protein binding; cell adhesion molecule binding
Cellular component	integral component of membrane; spanning component of plasma membrane; brush border membrane; cell junction; plasma membrane; extracellular exosome; apical plasma membrane; brush border; membrane; cell projection; microvillus membrane
Biological process	cell adhesion; epithelial cell differentiation; regulation of microvillus length; negative regulation of cell growth involved in contact inhibition; homophilic cell adhesion via plasma membrane adhesion molecules; cell-cell adhesion mediated by cadherin; intermicrovillar adhesion; cell differentiation; cell-cell adhesion
Sources:Amigo / QuickGO
Orthologs
Databases	NCBI: entry; OMA: entry
Species	Human	Mouse
Entrez	54825	268663
Ensembl	ENSG00000074276	ENSMUSG00000034918
UniProt	Q9BYE9	E9Q7P9
RefSeq (mRNA)	NM_001171976; NM_017675	NM_001033364
RefSeq (protein)	NP_001165447; NP_060145	NP_001028536
Location (UCSC)	Chr 5: 176.54 – 176.6 Mb	Chr 13: 54.85 – 54.88 Mb
PubMed search
- Wikidata
View/Edit Human	View/Edit Mouse

Cadherin-related family member 2 is a protein that in humans is encoded by the CDHR2 gene (previously PCDH24).

== Interactions ==
CDHR2 has been shown to interact with MAST2.
