= TRAPPC2 =

Protein-coding gene in humans

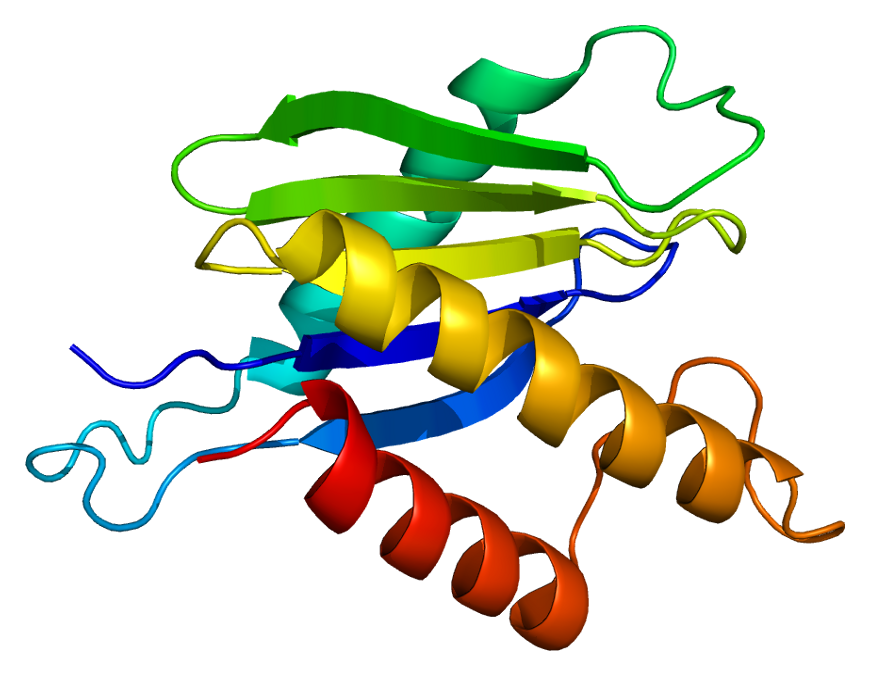

Identifiers
- Aliases: TRAPPC2, MIP2A, SEDL, SEDT, TRAPPC2P1, TRS20, ZNF547L, hYP38334, trafficking protein particle complex 2, trafficking protein particle complex subunit 2
- External IDs: OMIM: 300202; MGI: 1913476; GeneCards: TRAPPC2

Gene location (Human)
Chr.	X chromosome (human)
Band	Xp22.2	Start	13,712,244 bp
Band	Xp22.2	End	13,734,635 bp

Gene location (Mouse)
Chr.	X chromosome (mouse)
Band	X|X F5	Start	165,223,570 bp
Band	X|X F5	End	165,236,136 bp
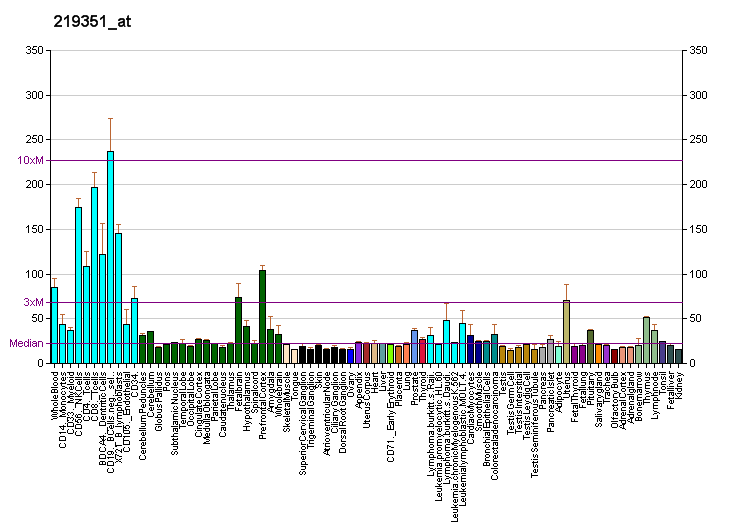

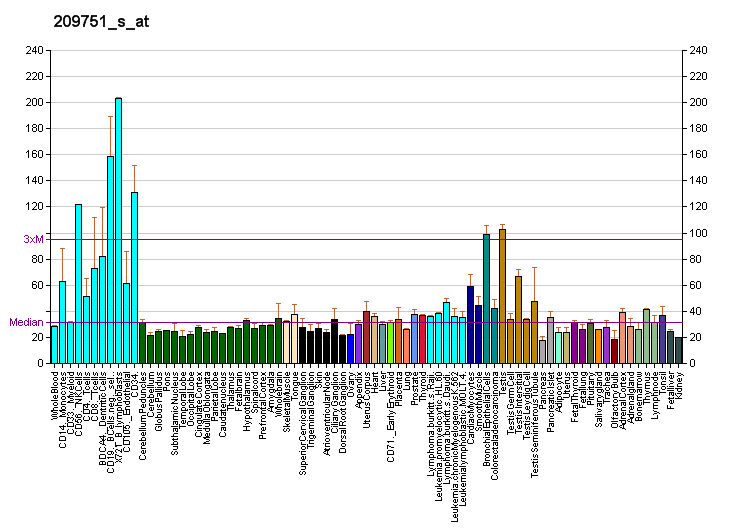
RNA expression pattern
Bgee	Human / Mouse (ortholog); Top expressed in: cerebellar vermis; cerebellar hemisphere; thymus; right hemisphere of cerebellum; epithelium of nasopharynx; ganglionic eminence; blood; lymph node; superficial temporal artery; urethra / Top expressed in: dentate gyrus of hippocampal formation granule cell; quadriceps femoris muscle; hippocampus proper; neural tube; zygote; Cortex of frontal lobe; mesencephalon; primary visual cortex; superior frontal gyrus; secondary oocyte; More reference expression data
BioGPS	More reference expression data
Gene ontology
Molecular function	transmembrane transporter binding; transcription factor binding; protein binding
Cellular component	cytoplasm; cytosol; intracellular anatomical structure; perinuclear region of cytoplasm; Golgi membrane; nucleus; nucleoplasm; endoplasmic reticulum; endoplasmic reticulum-Golgi intermediate compartment; intracellular membrane-bounded organelle; TRAPP complex
Biological process	skeletal system development; regulation of transcription, DNA-templated; transcription, DNA-templated; COPII vesicle coating; vesicle-mediated transport; endoplasmic reticulum to Golgi vesicle-mediated transport
Sources:Amigo / QuickGO
Orthologs
Databases	NCBI: entry; OMA: entry
Species	Human	Mouse
Entrez	6399	66226
Ensembl	ENSG00000196459	ENSMUSG00000079317
UniProt	P0DI81; P0DI82	Q9CQP2
RefSeq (mRNA)	NM_001011658; NM_001128835; NM_014563	NM_025432; NM_001313722
RefSeq (protein)	NP_001011658; NP_001122307; NP_055378; NP_001011658.1; NP_055378.1	NP_001300651; NP_079708; NP_079595
Location (UCSC)	Chr X: 13.71 – 13.73 Mb	Chr X: 165.22 – 165.24 Mb
PubMed search
- Wikidata
View/Edit Human	View/Edit Mouse

Trafficking protein particle complex subunit 2 (TRAPPC2) also known as MBP-1-interacting protein 2A (MIP-2A) is a protein that in humans is encoded by the TRAPPC2 gene. A processed pseudogene of this gene is located on chromosome 19, and other pseuodogenes of it are found on chromosome 8 and the Y chromosome. Two transcript variants encoding the same protein have been found for this gene.

== Function ==
Trafficking protein particle complex subunit 2 is thought to be part of a large multisubunit complex involved in the targeting and fusion of endoplasmic reticulum-to-Golgi transport vesicles with their acceptor compartment. In addition, the encoded protein can bind MBP1 and block its transcriptional repression capability.

== Genetic Location ==
The TRAPPC2 gene is located on the X-chromosome at position 22 between base-pairs 13,712,241 to 13,734,634.

== Clinical significance ==
Mutations in this gene are a cause of X-linked spondyloepiphyseal dysplasia tarda (SEDT).

== Interactions ==
TRAPPC2 has been shown to interact with Alpha-enolase and CLIC1.
