= Ethiofencarb =

- Line structure of ethiofencarb

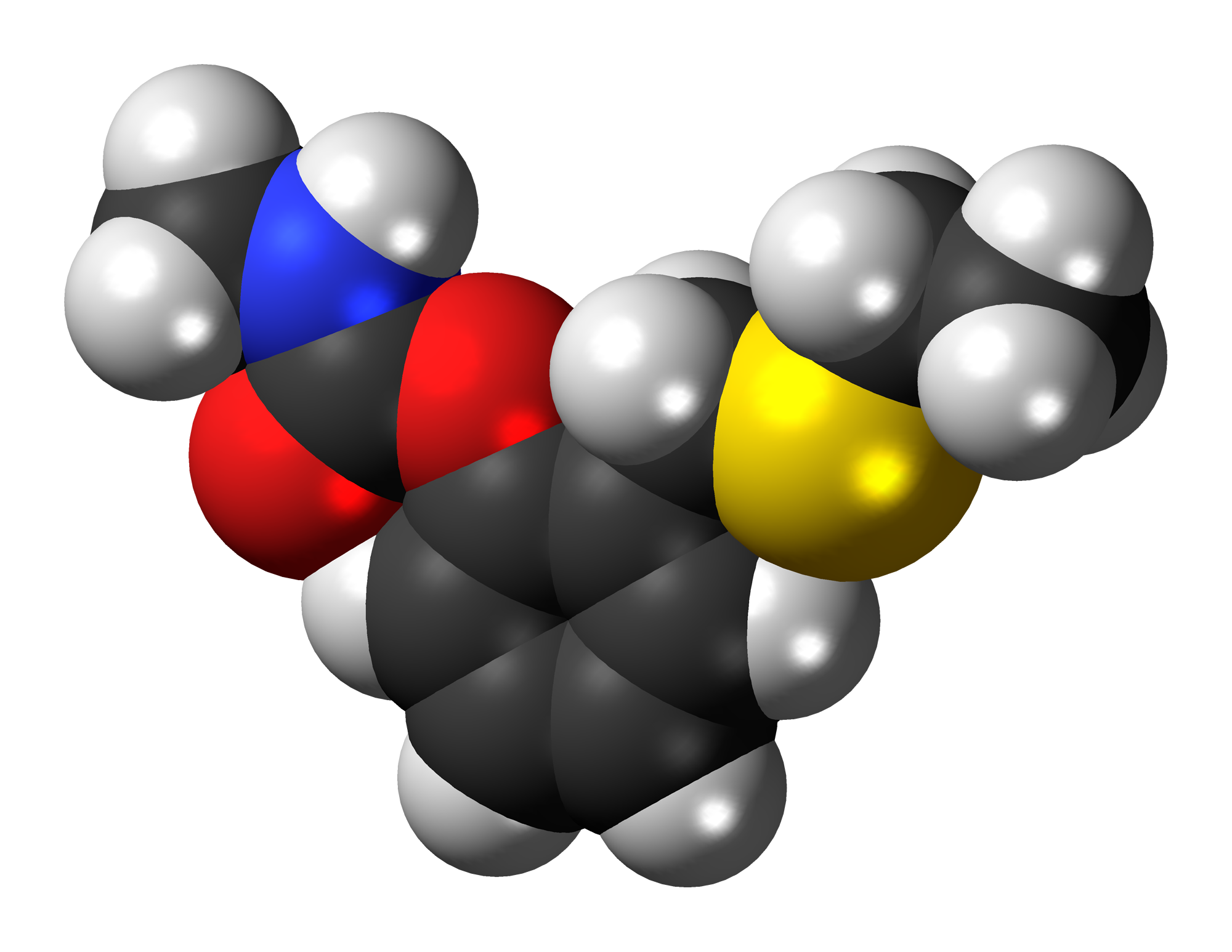
- Space-filling model of ethiofencarb

Names
- Preferred IUPAC name 2-[(Ethylsulfanyl)methyl]phenyl methylcarbamate
- Other names Carbamic acid, methyl-, 2-(ethylthiomethyl)phenyl ester, Croneton, Ethiofencarb, Ethiofencarb, ethiophencarbe, Ethiophencarp, HOX 1901, Phenol, 2-?(ethylthio)methyl-, methylcarbamate, Phenol, 2-(ethylthio)methyl, Phenol, 2-(ethylthio)methyl-, methylcarbamate (9CI), α-Ethylthio-o-tolyl methylcarbamate

Identifiers
CAS Number	29973-13-5
3D model (JSmol)	Interactive image
ChEBI	CHEBI:38483
ChEMBL	ChEMBL493480
ChemSpider	31991
ECHA InfoCard	100.045.423
EC Number	249-981-9
PubChem CID	34766
UNII	FY0YB813XV
CompTox Dashboard (EPA)	DTXSID3037545
- InChI: InChI=1/C11H15NO2S/c1-3-15-8-9-6-4-5-7-10(9)14-11(13)12-2/h4-7H,3,8H2,1-2H3,(H,12,13)/f/h12H
- SMILES: O=C(Oc1ccccc1CSCC)NC

Properties
Chemical formula	C_{11}H_{15}NO_{2}S
Molar mass	225.31 g·mol^{−1}
Appearance	Colorless crystals
Density	1.231 g/cm^{3} (20 °C)
Melting point	33.4 °C (92.1 °F; 306.5 K)
Boiling point	Decomposes upon distillation
Solubility in water	1.82 g/L at 20°C
Solubility	In dichloromethane, isopropanol and toluene >200, hexane 5-10
Vapor pressure	0.94 mPa

Hazards
- Occupational safety and health (OHS/OSH)
Main hazards	Toxic if swallowed
- GHS labelling
Pictograms	(GHS07: Exclamation mark) (GHS09: Environmental hazard)
Signal word	Warning
Hazard statements	H302, H410
Precautionary statements	P264, P270, P273, P301+P312, P330, P391, P501
- Except where otherwise noted, data are given for materials in their standard state (at 25 °C [77 °F], 100 kPa). Infobox references

Ethiofencarb is a carbamate insecticide which is useful in controlling aphids on hard and soft fruits and some vegetables. It is not as dangerous as organophosphorous pesticides, but is considered highly toxic to humans in the UK, moderately toxic under US EPA classification, and highly toxic to aquatic life.

== Mechanism of action ==
Carbamates are effective insecticides because of their ability to inhibit acetylcholinesterase (AChE) in the nervous system. Carbamate pesticides are less dangerous to humans than organophosphorus pesticides because carbamylation of the enzyme is unstable, and the regeneration of AChE is faster compared to a phosphorylated enzyme. Therefore the dose required to produce minimum symptoms of poisoning and a lethal dose is substantially larger for carbamate compounds than for organophosphorus compounds.

== Environmental fate ==
Ethiofencarb has an atmospheric half-life of 16 hours. When exposed to soil, ethiofencarb is moderately mobile and remains within the ground. It has been found to have a half-life of 2 weeks under greenhouse conditions. When added to water, it typically does not associate with the sediment, and can remain unchanged in an acidic environment, while it is hydrolyzed in an alkaline one. When dissolved in water, ethiofencarb is readily photodegraded by sunlight. Ethiofencarb could be transported from place to place in the environment through various natural waste pathways.

Carbamate groups are hydrolyzed to produce phenols and the N-methyl group undergoes hydroxylation. Sulfur is rapidly oxidized to give ethiofencarb sulfoxide. As stated above, ethiofencarb is stable in acidic conditions, but hydrolyzes when in the presence of a base. It was found to rapidly hydrolyze at pH conditions of 9 and 12. When subjected to sunlight, the main products that resulted from photodegredation are 2-hydroxybenzaldehyde and 3-methylbenzo[e-1,3]oxazine-2-4-dione. The main reaction to occur is the precession of ethiofencarb to its sulfide. When in plants, ethiofencarb is close to optimum lipophilicity as the plant breathes. The chemical is metabolized to a sulfoxide, to a sulfone and then hydrolyzed to a phenol sulfoxide and a phenol sulfone.

== Metabolism ==
Rats were administered a dosage of ethiofencarb, which was radio labeled, for 10 days and their urine was analyzed. It was found that 95% of the radioactivity was urinated out within 72 hours of administration. This chemical is rapidly oxidized in the bodies of mammals, hydrolyzing to phenolic metabolites.

== Safety ==
In humans, ethiofencarb can cause muscle weakness, dizziness, flushness, excess salivation, nausea, vomiting, diarrhea, abdominal pain, blurred vision, slurred speech and twitching. If a very high dose of ethiofencarb is administered then seizures, comas or hypertension could result. In severe cases, dyspnea, bronchospasms and bronchorrhea with impending pulmonary edema have been known to occur.

There have been a few human deaths reported. In one case, a 56-year-old gardener who had come in contact with too much of the insecticide, was found unconscious in his car after vomiting and was taken to a hospital. He developed a severe case of pulmonary edema within an hour of admission, and after three hours, he died and 26.4 mg/L ethiofencarb, along with 0/12 g/100 mL ethanol, 37.9 mg/L ethiofencarbsulfoxide and 0.9 mg/L ethiofencarbsulfone were found in his urine analysis.

== Regulation ==
Ethiofencarb is known to the World Health Organization as a 'highly hazardous' pesticide and the European Union's Nordic Council of Ministers refers to it as 'dangerous to the environment'. This chemical is no longer used or produced within the United States.
