= Alpha-enolase =

Protein found in humans

ENO1
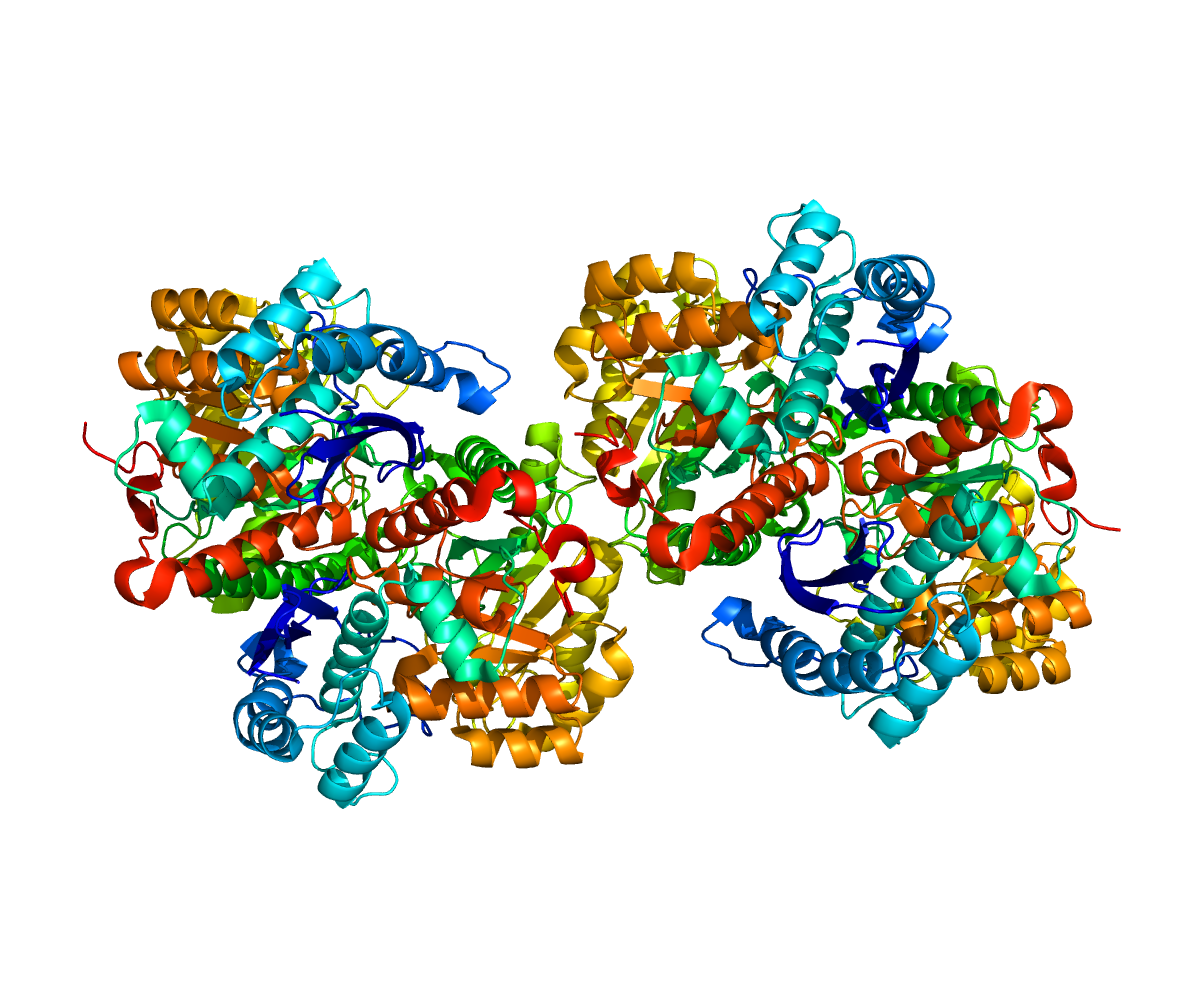

Identifiers
- Aliases: ENO1, ENO1L1, MPB1, NNE, PPH, HEL-S-17, enolase 1
- External IDs: OMIM: 172430; MGI: 95393; GeneCards: ENO1
Available structures
PDB	Ortholog search: PDBe RCSB
PDB	List of PDB id codes 2PSN, 3B97
Enzyme activity
EC #	BRENDA	ExPASy	KEGG	MetaCyc
4.2.1.11	↗	↗	↗	↗

Gene location (Human)
Chr.	Chromosome 1 (human)
Band	1p36.23	Start	8,861,000 bp
Band	1p36.23	End	8,879,190 bp

Gene location (Mouse)
Chr.	Chromosome 4 (mouse)
Band	4 E2|4 81.24 cM	Start	150,321,178 bp
Band	4 E2|4 81.24 cM	End	150,333,336 bp
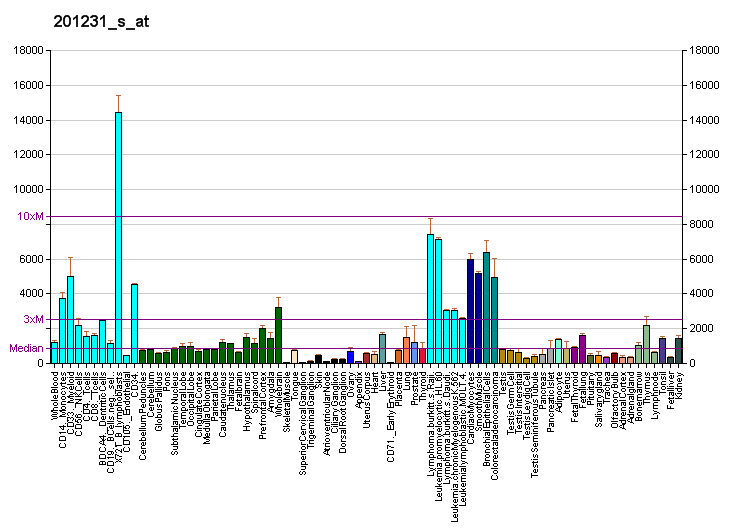
RNA expression pattern
Bgee	Human / Mouse (ortholog); Top expressed in: ventricular zone; nucleus accumbens; right frontal lobe; Achilles tendon; renal medulla; putamen; mucosa of esophagus; smooth muscle tissue; embryo; ascending aorta / Top expressed in: layer of retina; neural layer of retina; neural tube; tail of embryo; lens; granulocyte; mesencephalon; right kidney; epiblast; ventricular zone; More reference expression data
BioGPS	More reference expression data
Gene ontology
Molecular function	DNA binding; metal ion binding; protein binding; lyase activity; GTPase binding; magnesium ion binding; RNA binding; cadherin binding; DNA-binding transcription repressor activity, RNA polymerase II-specific; phosphopyruvate hydratase activity; protein homodimerization activity; RNA polymerase II transcription regulatory region sequence-specific DNA binding
Cellular component	cytoplasm; M band; membrane; extracellular exosome; nucleus; extracellular space; phosphopyruvate hydratase complex; cytosol; plasma membrane; cell surface; cell cortex region
Biological process	gluconeogenesis; regulation of transcription, DNA-templated; glycolytic process; response to virus; transcription, DNA-templated; negative regulation of cell growth; negative regulation of transcription, DNA-templated; negative regulation of transcription by RNA polymerase II; positive regulation of plasminogen activation; positive regulation of muscle contraction; canonical glycolysis; negative regulation of hypoxia-induced intrinsic apoptotic signaling pathway; positive regulation of ATP biosynthetic process
Sources:Amigo / QuickGO
Orthologs
Databases	NCBI: entry; OMA: entry
Species	Human	Mouse
Entrez	2023	13806
Ensembl	ENSG00000074800	ENSMUSG00000063524
UniProt	P06733	P17182
RefSeq (mRNA)	NM_001201483; NM_001428; NM_001353346	NM_023119; NM_001379127; NM_001379128
RefSeq (protein)	NP_001188412; NP_001419; NP_001340275	NP_001366056; NP_001366057; NP_075608; NP_001020559
Location (UCSC)	Chr 1: 8.86 – 8.88 Mb	Chr 4: 150.32 – 150.33 Mb
PubMed search
- Wikidata
View/Edit Human	View/Edit Mouse

Enolase 1 (ENO1), more commonly known as alpha-enolase, is a glycolytic enzyme expressed in most tissues, one of the isozymes of enolase. Each isoenzyme is a homodimer composed of 2 alpha, 2 gamma, or 2 beta subunits, and functions as a glycolytic enzyme. Alpha-enolase, in addition, functions as a structural lens protein (tau-crystallin) in the monomeric form. Alternative splicing of this gene results in a shorter isoform that has been shown to bind to the c-myc promoter and function as a tumor suppressor. Several pseudogenes have been identified, including one on the long arm of chromosome 1. Alpha-enolase has also been identified as an autoantigen in Hashimoto encephalopathy.

== Structure ==
ENO1 is one of three enolase isoforms, the other two being ENO2 (ENO-γ) and ENO3 (ENO-β). Each isoform is a protein subunit that can hetero- or homodimerize to form αα, αβ, αγ, ββ, and γγ dimers. The ENO1 gene spans 18 kb and lacks a TATA box while possessing multiple transcription start sites. A hypoxia-responsive element can be found in the ENO1 promoter and allows the enzyme to function in aerobic glycolysis and contribute to the Warburg effect in tumor cells.

=== Relationship to Myc-binding protein-1 ===
The mRNA transcript of the ENO1 gene can be alternatively translated into a cytoplasmic protein, with a molecular weight of 48 kDa, or a nuclear protein, with a molecular weight of a 37 kDa. The nuclear form was previously identified as Myc-binding protein-1 (MBP1), which downregulates the protein level of the c-myc protooncogene. A start codon at codon 97 of ENO1 and a Kozak consensus sequence were found preceding the 3' region of ENO1 encoding the MBP1 protein. In addition, the N-terminal region of the MBP1 protein it critical to DNA binding and, thus, its inhibitory function.

== Function ==
As an enolase, ENO1 is a glycolytic enzyme the catalyzes the conversion of 2-phosphoglycerate to phosphoenolpyruvate. This isozyme is ubiquitously expressed in adult human tissues, including liver, brain, kidney, and spleen. Within cells, ENO1 predominantly localizes to the cytoplasm, though an alternatively translated form is localized to the nucleus. Its nuclear form, also known as MBP1, functions solely as a tumor suppressor by binding and inhibiting the c-myc protooncogene promoter, and lacks the glycolytic enzyme activity of the cytoplasmic form. ENO1 also plays a role in other functions, including a cell surface receptor for plasminogen on pathogens, such as streptococci, and activated immune cells, leading to systemic infection or tissue invasion; an oxidative stress protein in endothelial cells; a lens crystalline; a heat shock protein; and a binding partner of cytoskeletal and chromatin structures to aid in transcription.

== Clinical significance ==
=== Cancer ===
ENO1 overexpression has been associated with multiple tumors, including glioma, neuroendocrine tumors, neuroblastoma, pancreatic cancer, prostate cancer, cholangiocarcinoma, thyroid carcinoma, lung cancer, hepatocellular carcinoma, and breast cancer. In many of these tumors, ENO1 promoted cell proliferation by regulating the PI3K/AKT signaling pathway and induced tumorigenesis by activating plasminogen. Moreover, ENO1 is expressed on the tumor cell surface during pathological conditions such as inflammation, autoimmunity, and malignancy. Its role as a plasminogen receptor leads to extracellular matrix degradation and cancer invasion. Due to its surface expression, targeting surface ENO1 enables selective targeting of tumor cells while leaving the ENO1 inside normal cells functional. Moreover, in tumors such as non-Hodgkin lymphomas (NHLs) and breast cancer, inhibition of ENO1 expression decreased tolerance to hypoxia while increasing sensitivity to radiation therapy, thus indicating that ENO1 may have aided chemoresistance. Considering these factors, ENO1 holds great potential to serve as an effective therapeutic target for treating many types of tumors in patients.

ENO1 is located on the 1p36 tumor suppressor locus near MIR34A which is homozygously deleted in Glioblastoma, Hepatocellular carcinoma and Cholangiocarcinoma. The co-deletion of ENO1 is a passenger event with the resultant tumor cells being entirely dependent on ENO2 for the execution of glycolysis. Tumor cells with such deletions are exceptionally sensitive towards ablation of ENO2. Inhibition of ENO2 in ENO1-homozygously deleted cancer cells constitutes an example of synthetic lethality treatment for cancer.

=== Autoimmune disease ===
ENO1 has been detected in serum drawn from children diagnosed with juvenile idiopathic arthritis.

Alpha-enolase has been identified as an autoantigen in Hashimoto's encephalopathy. Single studies have also identified it as an autoantigen associated with severe asthma and a putative target antigen of anti-endothelial cell antibody in Behçet's disease. Reduced expression of the enzyme has been found in the corneal epithelium of people suffering from keratoconus.

=== Gastrointestinal disease ===
CagA protein was found to activate ENO1 expression through activating the Src and MEK/ERK pathways as a mechanism for H. pylori-mediated gastric diseases.

=== Hemolytic anemia ===
Enolase deficiency is a rare inborn error of metabolism disease, leads to hemolytic anemia in affected homozygous carriers of loss of function mutations in ENO1. As with other glycolysis enzyme deficiency diseases, the condition is aggravated by redox-cycling agents such as nitrofurantoin.

== Interactive pathway map ==
Click on genes, proteins and metabolites below to link to respective articles. (Note: The interactive pathway map can be edited at WikiPathways: "GlycolysisGluconeogenesis_WP534".)

Glycolysis and Gluconeogenesis edit

== Interactions ==
Alpha-enolase has been shown to interact with TRAPPC2.

== See also ==
- Enolase
- ENO2
- ENO3
