= Enolase 2 =

Enzyme in mammals and humans

ENO2
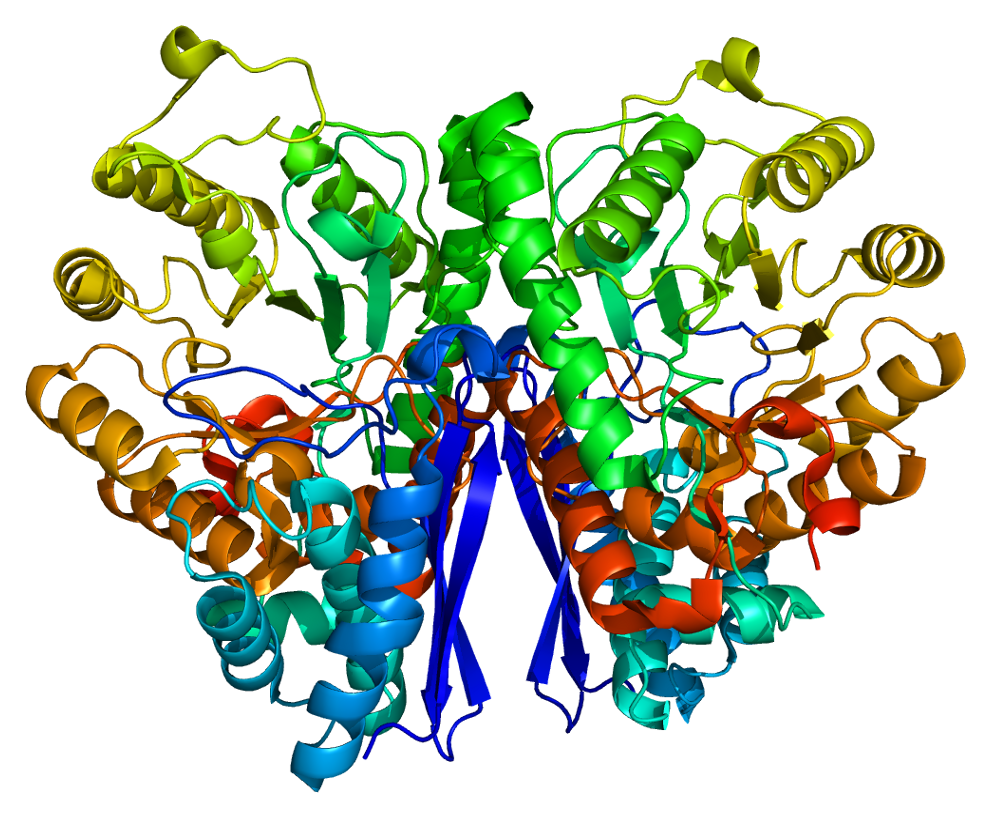

Identifiers
- Aliases: ENO2, HEL-S-279, NSE, Enolase 2
- External IDs: OMIM: 131360; MGI: 95394; GeneCards: ENO2
Available structures
PDB	Ortholog search: PDBe RCSB
PDB	List of PDB id codes 1TE6, 2AKM, 2AKZ, 3UCC, 3UCD, 3UJE, 3UJF, 3UJR, 3UJS, 4ZCW, 4ZA0
Enzyme activity
EC #	BRENDA	ExPASy	KEGG	MetaCyc
4.2.1.11	↗	↗	↗	↗

Gene location (Human)
Chr.	Chromosome 12 (human)
Band	12p13.31	Start	6,913,745 bp
Band	12p13.31	End	6,923,698 bp

Gene location (Mouse)
Chr.	Chromosome 6 (mouse)
Band	6 F2|6 59.17 cM	Start	124,737,016 bp
Band	6 F2|6 59.17 cM	End	124,746,636 bp
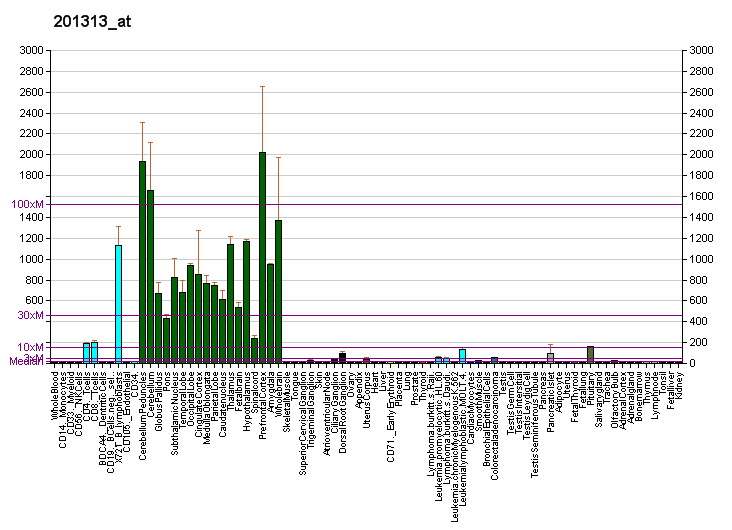
RNA expression pattern
Bgee	Human / Mouse (ortholog); Top expressed in: cerebellar hemisphere; right hemisphere of cerebellum; paraflocculus of cerebellum; cerebellar vermis; Brodmann area 10; right frontal lobe; frontal pole; Brodmann area 9; postcentral gyrus; cingulate gyrus / Top expressed in: motor neuron; pontine nuclei; cerebellar cortex; subiculum; superior frontal gyrus; dorsomedial hypothalamic nucleus; dentate gyrus of hippocampal formation granule cell; superior colliculus; primary motor cortex; lateral geniculate nucleus; More reference expression data
BioGPS	More reference expression data
Gene ontology
Molecular function	metal ion binding; protein binding; lyase activity; magnesium ion binding; phosphopyruvate hydratase activity
Cellular component	cytoplasm; cytosol; plasma membrane; phosphopyruvate hydratase complex; extracellular exosome; extracellular space; membrane; photoreceptor inner segment; soma; perikaryon; intracellular anatomical structure; myelin sheath
Biological process	gluconeogenesis; canonical glycolysis; glycolytic process
Sources:Amigo / QuickGO
Orthologs
Databases	NCBI: entry; OMA: entry
Species	Human	Mouse
Entrez	2026	13807
Ensembl	ENSG00000111674	ENSMUSG00000004267
UniProt	P09104; Q6FHV6	P17183
RefSeq (mRNA)	NM_001975	NM_013509; NM_001302642; NM_001355220
RefSeq (protein)	NP_001966; NP_001966.1	NP_001289571; NP_038537; NP_001342149
Location (UCSC)	Chr 12: 6.91 – 6.92 Mb	Chr 6: 124.74 – 124.75 Mb
PubMed search
- Wikidata
View/Edit Human	View/Edit Mouse

Gamma-enolase, also known as enolase 2 (ENO2) or neuron specific enolase (NSE), is an enzyme that in humans is encoded by the ENO2 gene. Gamma-enolase is a phosphopyruvate hydratase.

Gamma-enolase is one of the three enolase isoenzymes found in mammals. This isoenzyme, a homodimer, is found in mature neurons and cells of neuronal origin. A switch from alpha enolase to gamma enolase occurs in neural tissue during development in rats and primates.

== Interactive pathway map ==
Click on genes, proteins and metabolites below to link to respective articles. (Note: The interactive pathway map can be edited at WikiPathways: "GlycolysisGluconeogenesis_WP534".)

Glycolysis and Gluconeogenesis edit

== Utility ==
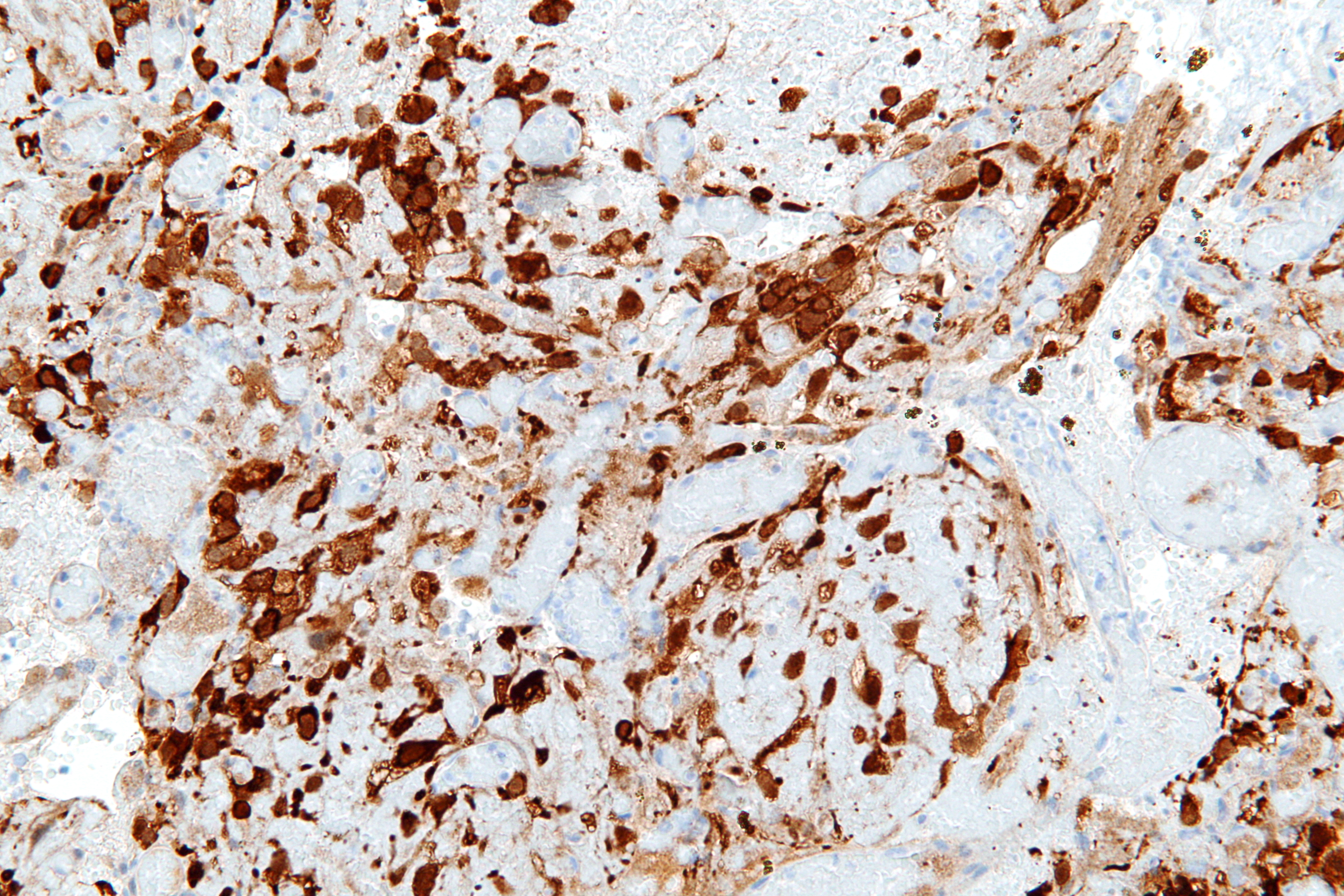
Neuron-specific enolase (NSE) immunostaining of a cerebellar hemangioblastoma.

Detection of NSE with antibodies can be used to identify neuronal cells and cells with neuroendocrine differentiation. NSE is produced by small-cell carcinomas, which are neuroendocrine in origin. NSE is therefore a useful tumor marker for distinguishing small-cell carcinomas from other tumors.
