= 2-Phosphoglyceric acid =

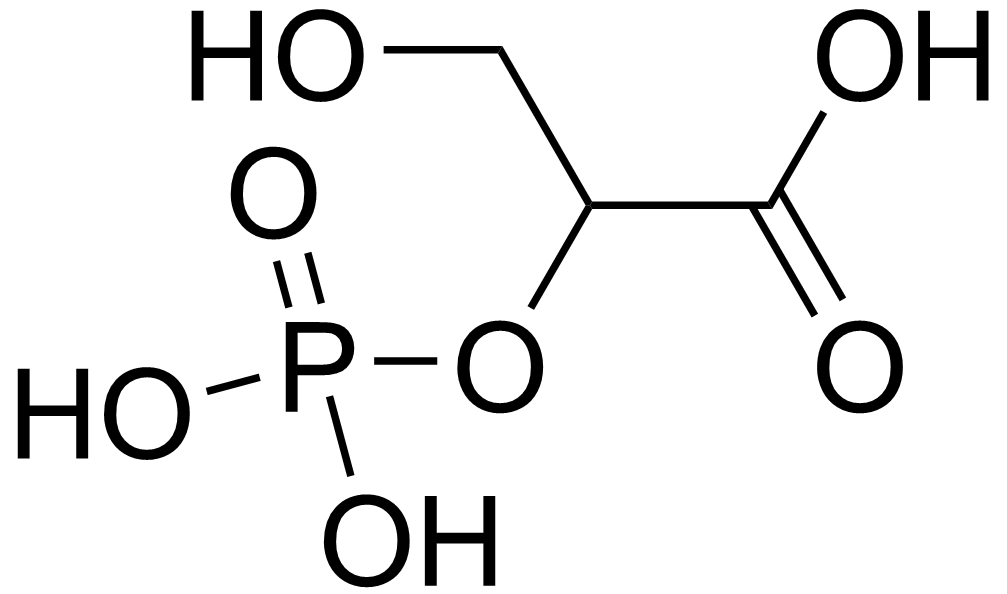

Names
- Preferred IUPAC name 3-Hydroxy-2-(phosphonooxy)propanoic acid
- Other names 2PG

Identifiers
CAS Number	2553-59-5
3D model (JSmol)	Interactive image; Interactive image
ChEBI	CHEBI:24344
ChemSpider	58
KEGG	C00631
PubChem CID	59
CompTox Dashboard (EPA)	DTXSID20948430
- InChI: InChI=1S/C3H7O7P/c4-1-2(3(5)6)10-11(7,8)9/h2,4H,1H2,(H,5,6)(H2,7,8,9) Key: GXIURPTVHJPJLF-UHFFFAOYSA-N; InChI=1/C3H7O7P/c4-1-2(3(5)6)10-11(7,8)9/h2,4H,1H2,(H,5,6)(H2,7,8,9) Key: GXIURPTVHJPJLF-UHFFFAOYAQ
- SMILES: C(C(C(=O)O)OP(=O)(O)O)O; O=P(O)(O)OC(C(=O)O)CO

Properties
Chemical formula	C_{3}H_{7}O_{7}P
Molar mass	186.056 g·mol^{−1}
- Except where otherwise noted, data are given for materials in their standard state (at 25 °C [77 °F], 100 kPa). verify (what is ?) Infobox references

2-Phosphoglyceric acid (2PG), or 2-phosphoglycerate, is a glyceric acid which serves as the substrate in the ninth step of glycolysis. It is catalyzed by enolase into phosphoenolpyruvate (PEP), the penultimate step in the conversion of glucose to pyruvate.

2-Phosphoglyceric acid is an intermediate that is part of the glycolysis pathway, and it is converted into phosphoenolpyruvate (PEP) by an enolase. There are three types of enolase enzymes that are able to catalyze the conversion of 2-phosphoglyceric acid into PEP, which are alpha-enolase, beta-enolase, and gamma-enolase. Studies have found that alpha-enolase is the most common enolase, so it is often the specific enolase used to convert 2-phosphoglyceric acid into PEP. Alpha-enolase catalyzes this conversion process by acting as a hydrolase, which means that alpha-enolase removes a water molecule from the 2-phosphoglyceric acid in order to form PEP.

== In glycolysis ==
3-phospho-D-glycerate	Phosphoglyceromutase	2-phospho-D-glycerate	Enolase	phosphoenolpyruvate
			H_{2}O
			H_{2}O
	Phosphoglyceromutase		Enolase

Compound C00197 at KEGG Pathway Database. Enzyme 5.4.2.1 at KEGG Pathway Database. Compound C00631 at KEGG Pathway Database. Enzyme 4.2.1.11 at KEGG Pathway Database. Compound C00074 at KEGG Pathway Database.

Click on genes, proteins and metabolites below to link to respective articles. (Note: The interactive pathway map can be edited at WikiPathways: "GlycolysisGluconeogenesis_WP534".)

Glycolysis and Gluconeogenesis edit

== See also ==
- 3-Phosphoglyceric acid
