= APOBEC =

Enzyme involved in messenger RNA editing

APOBEC-like N-terminal domain

Identifiers
- Symbol: APOBEC_N
- Pfam: PF08210
- InterPro: IPR013158
Available protein structures:
- PDB: IPR013158 PF08210 (ECOD; PDBsum)
- AlphaFold: IPR013158; PF08210

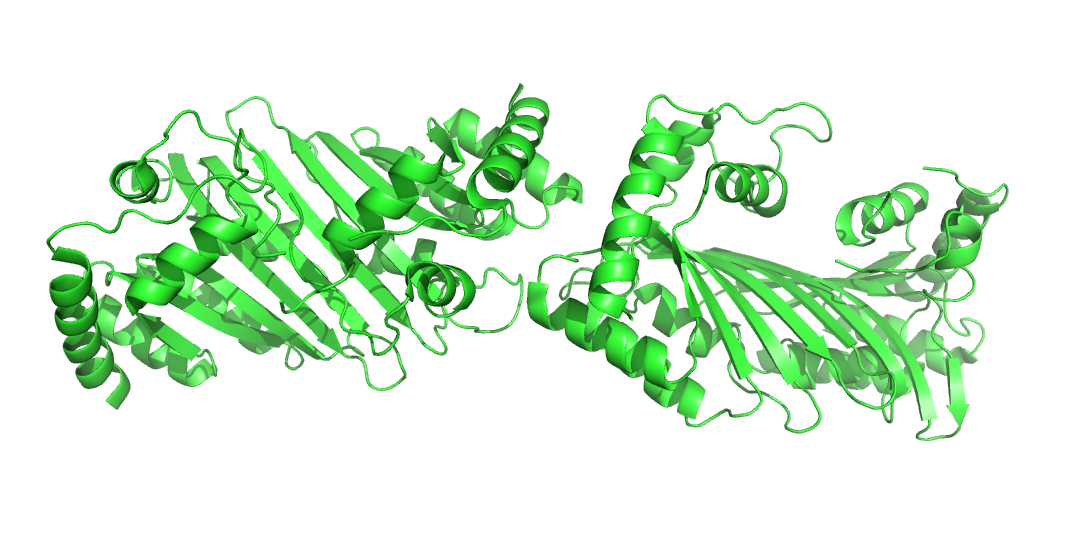
Example of a member of the APOBEC family, APOBEC-2. A cytidine deaminase from Homo sapiens.

APOBEC-like C-terminal domain

Identifiers
- Symbol: APOBEC_C
- Pfam: PF05240
- InterPro: IPR007904
Available protein structures:
- PDB: IPR007904 PF05240 (ECOD; PDBsum)
- AlphaFold: IPR007904; PF05240

APOBEC ("apolipoprotein B mRNA editing enzyme, catalytic polypeptide") is a family of evolutionarily conserved mRNA/DNA editing cytidine deaminases.

== Function ==
A mechanism of generating protein diversity is mRNA editing. The APOBEC family of proteins perform mRNA modifications by deaminating cytidine bases to uracil. The N-terminal domain of APOBEC-like proteins is the catalytic domain, while the C-terminal domain is a pseudocatalytic domain. More specifically, the catalytic domain is a zinc dependent cytidine deaminase domain and is essential for cytidine deamination. The positively charged zinc ion in the catalytic domain attracts to the partial-negative charge of RNA.

In the case of APOBEC-1, the mRNA transcript of intestinal apolipoprotein B is altered. RNA editing by APOBEC-1 requires homodimerization and this complex interacts with RNA-binding proteins to form the editosome. The resulting structure interacts with the codon CAA at codon 2153 and deaminates it into UAA, producing a stop codon that results in mRNA that is translated into the intestinal apoB-48 isoform. For other APOBEC-modified transcripts such as in the site-specific deamination of a CGA to a UGA stop codon in neurofibromatosis type 1 (NF1) mRNA, the resulting proteins are predicted to be truncated as well, although these transcripts are possibly degraded.

C-to-U modifications do not always result in the truncation of proteins. For example, in humans/mammals they help protect from viral infections. APOBEC family proteins are widely expressed in cells of the human innate immune system.

== Cancer ==
These enzymes, when misregulated, are a major source of mutation in numerous cancer types. When the expression of APOBEC family proteins is triggered, accidental mutations in somatic cells can lead to the development of oncogenes, cells which have the potential to develop into a tumor. APOBEC proteins are further expressed in attempt to regulate tumor formation. This makes APOBEC proteins a helpful marker for diagnosing malignant tumors.

== Structure ==
A 2013 review discussed the structural and biophysical aspects of APOBEC3 family enzymes. Many of the APOBEC protein features are described in the widely studied APOBEC3G's page.

== Family members ==
Human genes encoding members of the APOBEC protein family include:

- APOBEC1
- APOBEC2
- APOBEC3A
- APOBEC3B
- APOBEC3C
- APOBEC3D ("APOBEC3E" now refers to this)
- APOBEC3F
- APOBEC3G
- APOBEC3H
- APOBEC4
- Activation-induced (cytidine) deaminase (AID)

== Bibliography ==
- Gupta, A., Gazzo, A., Selenica, P. et al., APOBEC3 mutagenesis drives therapy resistance in breast cancer, Nature Genetics (April 1, 2025) doi:10.1038/s41588-025-02187-1
This article incorporates text from the public domain Pfam and InterPro: IPR013158
