= APOBEC3H =

Protein-coding gene in Homo sapiens

Identifiers
- Aliases: APOBEC3H, A3H, ARP-10, ARP10, apolipoprotein B mRNA editing enzyme catalytic subunit 3H
- External IDs: OMIM: 610976; GeneCards: APOBEC3H
Enzyme activity
EC #	BRENDA	ExPASy	KEGG	MetaCyc
3.5.4.38	↗	↗	↗	↗

Gene location (Human)
Chr.	Chromosome 22 (human)
Band	22q13.1	Start	39,097,224 bp
Band	22q13.1	End	39,104,067 bp
RNA expression pattern
Bgee	Human / Mouse (ortholog); Top expressed in: granulocyte; gastric mucosa; blood; lymph node; spleen; appendix; right uterine tube; gallbladder; smooth muscle tissue; right adrenal cortex / n/a; More reference expression data
BioGPS	n/a
Gene ontology
Molecular function	hydrolase activity, acting on carbon-nitrogen (but not peptide) bonds, in cyclic amidines; cytidine deaminase activity; zinc ion binding; protein binding; catalytic activity; hydrolase activity; metal ion binding; RNA binding
Cellular component	cytoplasm; P-body; nucleus
Biological process	negative regulation of transposition; innate immune response; defense response to virus; DNA cytosine deamination; negative regulation of viral process; negative regulation of single stranded viral RNA replication via double stranded DNA intermediate; immune system process; cytidine deamination; cytidine to uridine editing; DNA demethylation
Sources:Amigo / QuickGO
Orthologs
Databases	NCBI: entry; OMA: entry
Species	Human	Mouse
Entrez	164668	n/a
Ensembl	ENSG00000100298	n/a
UniProt	Q6NTF7	n/a
RefSeq (mRNA)	NM_001166002; NM_001166003; NM_001166004; NM_181773	n/a
RefSeq (protein)	NP_001159474; NP_001159475; NP_001159476; NP_861438	n/a
Location (UCSC)	Chr 22: 39.1 – 39.1 Mb	n/a
PubMed search		n/a
- Wikidata
View/Edit Human

DNA dC->dU-editing enzyme APOBEC-3H, also known as Apolipoprotein B mRNA-editing enzyme catalytic polypeptide-like 3H or APOBEC-related protein 10, is a protein that in humans is encoded by the APOBEC3H gene.

== Function ==
This gene encodes a member of the apolipoprotein B mRNA-editing enzyme catalytic polypeptide (APOBEC) family of proteins. The encoded protein is a cytidine deaminase that has antiretroviral activity by generating lethal hypermutations in viral genomes. Polymorphisms and alternative splicing in this gene influence its antiretroviral activity and are associated with increased resistance to human immunodeficiency virus type 1 infection in certain populations. There are only one to two members of this family of genes in nonprimate mammals but at least seven members in primates. APOBEC3H is an antiviral effector. In Old World, monkeys APOBEC3H has efficient antiviral activity against primate lentiviruses and it is sensitive to inactivation by the simian immunodeficiency virus Vif protein, and is capable of hypermutating retroviral genomes. The typical human APOBEC3H gene is inherently poorly expressed in primate cells and is ineffective at inhibiting retroviral replication. Importantly, different people have different strengths and potencies of APOBEC3H. People with version of the gene for APOBEC3H which produce stable variations of the protein can successfully limit HIV-1's ability to replicate.
