= Intrinsic and extrinsic properties =

Properties of an object which are/aren't part of the object itself

In science and engineering, an intrinsic property is a property of a specified subject that exists itself or within the subject. An extrinsic property is not essential or inherent to the subject that is being characterized. For example, mass is an intrinsic property of any physical object, whereas weight is an extrinsic property that depends on the strength of the gravitational field in which the object is placed.

== Applications ==
In materials science, an intrinsic property is independent of how much of a material is present and is independent of the form of the material, e.g., one large piece or a collection of small particles. Intrinsic properties are dependent mainly on the fundamental chemical composition and structure of the material. Extrinsic properties are differentiated as being dependent on the presence of avoidable chemical contaminants or structural defects.

In biology, intrinsic effects originate from inside an organism or cell, such as an autoimmune disease or intrinsic immunity.

In electronics and optics, intrinsic properties of devices (or systems of devices) are generally those that are free from the influence of various types of non-essential defects. Such defects may arise as a consequence of design imperfections, manufacturing errors, or operational extremes and can produce distinctive and often undesirable extrinsic properties. The identification, optimization, and control of both intrinsic and extrinsic properties are among the engineering tasks necessary to achieve the high performance and reliability of modern electrical and optical systems.

== See also ==
- Intensive and extensive properties
- Intrinsic and extrinsic motivation
