= King Salman Center for Disability Research =

Saudi Arabian nonprofit organization

- Formation: 1991
- Founder: Salman bin Abdul-Aziz Al Saud; Sultan bin Salman bin Abdulaziz Al Saud
- Type: Non-Profit Research
- Location: Riyadh, Saudi Arabia
- Region served: Riyadh
- Key people: Ola Abusukkar
- Employees: 60-100
- Website: www.kscdr.org.sa

The King Salman Center for Disability Research (KSCDR; Arabic: مركز الملك سلمان لأبحاث الإعاقة, romanized: Markaz al-Malik Salmān li-Abḥāth al-Iʻāqah) is a non-profit organization based in Riyadh, Saudi Arabia. It conducts and funds laboratory and field research on all aspects and ages of disability. Its aim is to improve the quality of life of all persons living with disabilities by promoting research that results in real-life changes and activities that help reduce the impact of disability.

== History ==
KSCDR is named in honor of the Custodian of the Two Holy Mosques King Salman bin Abdulaziz Al Saud. It was founded in 1992 by His Royal Highness Prince Sultan bin Salman bin Abdulaziz Al Saud to complement the Disabled Children Association (DCA), a service-oriented organization for children living with disabilities in Saudi Arabia. It was partially funded by Sheikh Hassan Enany.

== Activities ==
=== Newborn screening program ===
In 2005, KSCDR launched the Newborn Screening program in partnership with the Ministry of Health, King Faisal Specialist Hospital and Research Centre, and several MOH affiliated hospitals in Saudi Arabia. The program screens for 16 different types of inherited metabolic and endocrine disorders and averages over 170,000 yearly screenings.

=== Universal accessibility ===
In 2010, KSCDR published the Universal Accessibility Guidelines as part of its campaign to introduce the universal accessibility concept in Saudi Arabia.

=== Learning disability ===
KSCDR provides in-school training workshops for teachers to help them recognize and teach students with LD. It collaborates with the Center for Child Evaluation and Teaching in Kuwait and with local and international experts to develop standardized learning disability assessment tools in Arabic. In 2012, KSCDR forged a partnership with McGraw-Hill Education Services to develop educational programs benefiting students with learning difficulties.

=== Research ===
KSCDR is actively pursuing a number of research topics. These include research in the area of visual impairment, speech impairment, autism, and mental health.

== King Salman Award for Disability Research ==
In December 2010, KSCDR established the King Salman Award for Disability Research to recognize significant contributions and impact made by individuals and/or organizations in the field of disability.

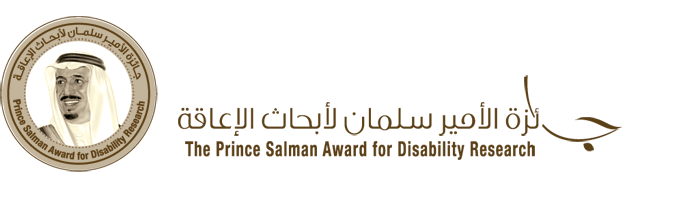

=== Nominations ===
Nominations are accepted from local, regional, and international research and scientific organizations, societies and agencies dealing with disabled individuals, and academic departments, faculties, and universities. Nominations from individuals are not accepted.

=== Areas ===
The Award is granted in the following three main areas of disability:

1. Health and Medical Sciences.
2. Pedagogical and Educational Sciences.
3. Rehabilitative and Social Sciences.

=== Value ===
Awardees in their respective areas receive the following:

1. A certificate bearing the name of the winner as well as a summary of the work that earned him/her the Award.
2. An honorary medal.
3. A sum of five-hundred thousand Saudi Riyals (approximately US$133,450)

== Recognitions ==
KSCDR received the European Union's Chaillot Award in 2011 for its work on protecting the rights of disabled people.

KSCDR is the recipient of the 2011–2012 Sheikh Hamdan bin Rashid Al Maktoum Award for the Best Medical College/Institution or Centre in the Arab World.

== List of chief executives ==
1. Sultan bin Turki Al Sedairy (2004–2019)
2. Ola Abusukkar (2019–2021)

== See also ==
- List of things named after Saudi kings
