= APOBEC4 =

Protein-coding gene in humans

Identifiers
- Aliases: APOBEC4, C1orf169, apolipoprotein B mRNA editing enzyme catalytic polypeptide like 4
- External IDs: OMIM: 609908; MGI: 1918531; GeneCards: APOBEC4

Gene location (Human)
Chr.	Chromosome 1 (human)
Band	1q25.3	Start	183,646,275 bp
Band	1q25.3	End	183,653,316 bp

Gene location (Mouse)
Chr.	Chromosome 1 (mouse)
Band	1|1 G3	Start	152,626,302 bp
Band	1|1 G3	End	152,633,295 bp
RNA expression pattern
Bgee	Human / Mouse (ortholog); Top expressed in: bronchial epithelial cell; olfactory zone of nasal mucosa; mucosa of paranasal sinus; sperm; right uterine tube; epithelium of nasopharynx; left testis; right testis; caput epididymis; right lung / Top expressed in: seminiferous tubule; spermatid; spermatocyte; olfactory epithelium; islet of Langerhans; More reference expression data
BioGPS	n/a
Orthologs
Databases	NCBI: entry; OMA: entry
Species	Human	Mouse
Entrez	403314	71281
Ensembl	ENSG00000173627	ENSMUSG00000055547
UniProt	Q8WW27	n/a
RefSeq (mRNA)	NM_203454	NM_001081197
RefSeq (protein)	NP_982279	n/a
Location (UCSC)	Chr 1: 183.65 – 183.65 Mb	Chr 1: 152.63 – 152.63 Mb
PubMed search
- Wikidata
View/Edit Human	View/Edit Mouse

C->U-editing enzyme APOBEC-4, also known as Apolipoprotein B mRNA-editing enzyme catalytic polypeptide-like 4, is a protein that in humans is encoded by the APOBEC4 gene. It is primarily expressed in testis and found in mammals, chicken, but not fishes.

== Function ==
This gene encodes a member of the AID / APOBEC family of polynucleotide (deoxy)cytidine deaminases, which convert cytidine to uridine. Other AID/APOBEC family members are involved in mRNA editing, somatic hypermutation and recombination of immunoglobulin genes, and innate immunity to retroviral infection.

A recent study on APOBEC4 (A4) revealed an interesting finding that A4 enhanced the replication of HIV-1 through boosting promoter activity, it also increased the expression of other relevant promoter mediated enhanced protein expression. Biochemical analysis of A4 showed the lack of cytidine deaminase activity on single stranded DNA and it binds DNA rather weak.
