= A3G =

A3G may refer to:

- APOBEC3G, an immune system enzyme
- Apartment 3-G, a comic strip
- A nickname for David Lat
