= Michael Stratton =

British clinical scientist (born 1957)

Sir Michael Stratton FRS FMedSci FRCPath
- Born: Michael Rudolf Stratton; 22 June 1957 (age 69)
- Education: Haberdashers' Aske's Boys' School
- Alma mater: University of Oxford (BM BCh); University of London (PhD)
- Known for: Cancer Genome Project; Discovery of BRCA2; Mutational signatures
- Spouse: Judith Breuer (m. 1981)
- Awards: EMBO Member (2009); Knight Bachelor (2013); Louis-Jeantet Prize for Medicine (2013); Royal Medal (2024); Jessie Stevenson Kovalenko Medal (2026)
- Scientific career
- Workplaces: Wellcome Trust Sanger Institute; Institute of Cancer Research; Guy's Hospital; University of Oxford
- Thesis: Role of genetic alterations in the genesis of human soft tissue tumours and medulloblastoma (1990)
- Doctoral students: Nazneen Rahman; Ludmil Alexandrov
- Website: sanger.ac.uk/person/stratton-mike

Sir Michael Rudolf Stratton (born 22 June 1957) is a British clinical scientist and the third director of the Wellcome Trust Sanger Institute. He currently heads the Cancer Genome Project and is a leader of the International Cancer Genome Consortium.

== Education ==
Stratton was educated at the independent Haberdashers' Aske's Boys' School and obtained a Bachelor of Medicine, Bachelor of Surgery degree from the University of Oxford where he was a student of Brasenose College, Oxford. He completed his clinical training at Guy's Hospital before training as a histopathologist at the Hammersmith and Maudsley Hospitals in London. He obtained a PhD while working on Medulloblastomas in the molecular biology of cancer at the Institute of Cancer Research, awarded by the University of London in 1990.

== Career and research ==
Stratton has held clinical posts at Guy's Hospital, Westminster Hospital, Hammersmith Hospital and the Royal Marsden Hospital. He took up a Faculty appointment and now holds a Professorship at the Institute of Cancer Research. He joined the Sanger Institute in 2000 and was promoted to deputy director in 2007. In May 2010, he was appointed director, succeeding Allan Bradley.

Stratton's research interests are in the area of genetics of cancer. In 1994, he assembled a research group that localised BRCA2, a major breast cancer susceptibility gene that repairs chromosomal damage, to chromosome 13. The following year his team identified the gene and, in doing so generated a megabase segment of high-quality human genome sequence. His subsequent work has involved the identification of more moderate cancer susceptibility genes such as CHEK2, ATM and PALB2 each of which play a role in some breast cancers. He has additionally identified genes implicated in the development of skin, testis, colorectal and thyroid cancers, Wilms tumour and Peutz–Jeghers syndrome.

At the announcement of the completion of the Human Genome Project in 2000, Stratton discussed using genome sequences to revolutionise cancer treatment. He and Andy Futreal had already initiated the Cancer Genome Project at the Sanger Centre, as it was then known, to use genome-wide analysis to find somatic mutations in human cancers. According to fellow cancer researcher Chris Marshall, doing so prior to the completion of the human genome sequence was an "audacious idea." The aims of the project are to identify new cancer genes, to understand how cancers develop and to study how the structure of genomes influence cancer. In 2002 and 2004, Stratton's team discovered mutations in the BRAF and ERBB2 genes in approximately 60 per cent of melanomas and 4 per cent of non-small-cell lung cancers respectively.

In 2009, Stratton and colleagues reported the first complete cancer genomes, from a lung tumour and a melanoma. They also analysed the genomes from 24 different breast tumours and found a diversity of DNA abnormalities, indicating that cancers can be divided in more subcategories than previously thought. Stratton's team maintain the Catalogue of Somatic Mutations in Cancer (COSMIC) database, a set of online resources available to the scientific community. He is also one of the lead researchers in the International Cancer Genome Project, a £600 million, multi-national project to sequence 25 000 cancer genomes, from 50 different types of cancer. Stratton's research has been funded by the Wellcome Trust and the Medical Research Council (MRC).

=== Controversy ===
In August 2018 it was reported that an investigation was under way into allegations of bullying of staff and gender discrimination made against senior management of the Wellcome Trust Sanger Institute, including Stratton. The independent investigation, carried out by the barrister Thomas Kibling from Matrix Chambers, concluded in October 2018 and cleared Stratton of any wrongdoing. The public report stated that the allegation of bullying was "misplaced, unwarranted and misconceived", while also listing areas for improvement in the workings of the Sanger Institute. Some of the claimants disputed these findings.

=== Awards and honours ===
Stratton was elected a Fellow of the Academy of Medical Sciences (FMedSci) in 1999, elected a Fellow of the Royal Society in 2008, elected to EMBO Membership in 2009 and was awarded the Lila Gruber Cancer Research Award in 2010. He was knighted in the 2013 Birthday Honours for services to medical science. His nomination for the Royal Society reads:

Michael Stratton is distinguished for his contributions to the genetics of human cancer. Using genetic linkage studies and positional cloning, he mapped and isolated the breast cancer susceptibility gene BRCA2 and subsequently other cancer predisposition genes: CYLD and STK11. To provide a new approach to find cancer genes he promoted the notion of large scale systematic searches of the human genome for somatic mutations in cancer and initiated the Cancer Genome Project leading to the discovery of BRAF as a melanoma gene. His work has important implications for the understanding of the genetic mechanisms underlying cancer, diagnosis and therapy.

In May 2022, Stratton was awarded the inaugural 'In Search of Wonder Lifetime Achievement Award' at the Cambridge Independent's Science and Technology Awards, sponsored by Waterbeach creative design agency JDJ Creative. He received the award at a ceremony held at the Wellcome Genome Campus, just three months after announcing his decision to step down as director of the Wellcome Sanger Institute and CEO of the Wellcome Genome Campus after 12 years in the post. In 2024 he received the Royal Medal of the Royal Society.

Non-profit organization positions
Preceded by Allan Bradley	Director of the Wellcome Trust Sanger Institute; 2010–2023	Succeeded by Matthew Hurles
