= Intrinsic immunity =

Cellular-based anti-viral defense mechanisms

Intrinsic immunity refers to a set of cellular-based anti-viral defense mechanisms, notably genetically encoded proteins which specifically target eukaryotic retroviruses. Unlike adaptive and innate immunity effectors, intrinsic immune proteins are usually expressed at a constant level, allowing a viral infection to be halted quickly. Intrinsic antiviral immunity refers to a form of innate immunity that directly restricts viral replication and assembly, thereby rendering a cell non-permissive to a specific class or species of viruses. Intrinsic immunity is conferred by restriction factors preexisting in certain cell types, although these factors can be further induced by virus infection. Intrinsic viral restriction factors recognize specific viral components, but unlike other pattern recognition receptors that inhibit viral infection indirectly by inducing interferons and other antiviral molecules, intrinsic antiviral factors block viral replication immediately and directly.

== Background ==
Eukaryotic organisms have been exposed to viral infections for millions of years. The development of the innate and adaptive immune system reflects the evolutionary importance of fighting infection. Some viruses, however, have proven to be so deadly or refractory to conventional immune mechanisms that specific, genetically encoded cellular defense mechanisms have evolved to combat them. Intrinsic immunity comprises cellular proteins which are always active and have evolved to block infection by specific viruses or viral taxa.

The recognition of intrinsic immunity as a potent anti-viral defense mechanism is a recent discovery and is not yet discussed in most immunology courses or texts. Though the extent of protection intrinsic immunity affords is still unknown, it is possible that intrinsic immunity may eventually be considered a third branch of the traditionally bipartite immune system.

== Relationship to the immune system ==
Intrinsic Immunity combines aspects of the two traditional branches of the immune system – adaptive and innate immunity – but is mechanistically distinct. Innate cellular immunity recognizes viral infection using toll-like receptors (TLRs), or pattern recognition receptors, which sense Pathogen-associated molecular patterns (PAMPs), triggering the expression of nonspecific antiviral proteins. Intrinsic immune proteins, however, are specific both in virus recognition and their mechanism of viral attenuation. Like innate immunity, however, the intrinsic immune system does not respond differently upon repeat infection by the same pathogen. Also, like adaptive immunity, intrinsic immunity is specifically tailored to a single type or class of pathogens, notably retroviruses.

Unlike adaptive and innate immunity, which must sense the infection to be turned on (and can take weeks to become effective in the case of adaptive immunity) intrinsic immune proteins are constitutively expressed and ready to shut down infection immediately following viral entry. This is particularly important in retroviral infections since viral integration into the host genome occurs quickly after entry and reverse transcription and is largely irreversible.

Because the production of intrinsic immune mediating proteins cannot be increased during infection, these defenses can become saturated and ineffective if a cell is infected with a high level of virus.

== Activities of canonical intrinsic immune proteins ==
- TRIM5α (Tripartite interaction motif five, splice variant α) is one of the most studied intrinsic immune proteins due to its connection with human immunodeficiency virus (HIV) and simian immunodeficiency virus (SIV). This constitutively expressed protein recognizes the capsid proteins of entering retroviruses and prevents viral uncoating and reverse transcription through an unknown mechanism. The rhesus monkey TRIM5α variant is able to recognize and prevent HIV infection, whereas the human TRIM5α protein can prevent SIV infection. This variation helps explain why HIV and SIV infect humans and monkeys respectively, and probably reflects a previous epidemic of what we now call HIV among ancestors of current rhesus monkey populations.
- APOBEC3G (Apolipoprotein editing complex 3 G) is another intrinsic immune protein which interferes with HIV infection. APOBEC3G is a cytidine deaminase against single stranded DNA which introduces transversion mutations into the HIV genome during reverse transcription by randomly changing cytidine basepairs into uracil. Though this will not necessarily stop viral integration, the resulting progeny viral genomes are too riddled with mutations to be viable. APOBEC3G expression is disrupted by the HIV vif protein which induces its degradation through the ubiquitin/proteasome system. Vif actually exploits our intrinsic immunity, titrating the degree of APOBEC3G polyubiquitination in order to augment the genetic variability already present in HIV-1 (owing to its mutation-happy reverse transcriptase). Vif therefore acts via APOBEC3G to increase the likelihood of the generation of escape mutants in HIV-1 pathogenesis. If an HIVΔvif deletion mutant is created it will be able to infect a cell, but will produce non-viable progeny virus due to the action of APOBEC3G.

Other intrinsic immune proteins have been discovered which block Murine leukemia virus (MLV), Herpes simplex virus (HSV), and Human Cytomegalovirus (HCMV). In many cases, such as that of APOBEC3G above, viruses have evolved mechanisms for disrupting the actions of these proteins. Another example is the cellular protein Daxx, which silences viral promoters, but is degraded by an active HCMV protein early in infection.
