= Ludmil Alexandrov =

Bulgarian-American scientist

- Born: Ludmil B. Alexandrov
- Education: University of Cambridge
- Known for: Mutational signatures
- Scientific career
- Fields: Computational Biology; Cancer Genomics; Mutagenesis; Ageing; Bioinformatics
- Institutions: Los Alamos National Laboratory; Wellcome Sanger Institute; UC San Diego
- Thesis: Signatures of mutational processes in human cancer (2014)
- Doctoral advisor: Michael Stratton
- Website: profiles.ucsd.edu/ludmil.alexandrov

Ludmil B. Alexandrov is a Bulgarian-American scientist and an associate professor at the University of California, San Diego.

== Education ==
Alexandrov received his PhD from University of Cambridge in 2014.

== Career and research ==
Alexandrov is known for developing the concept of mutational signatures together with Michael Stratton and colleagues at the Wellcome Sanger Institute.

Alexandrov's research interests are in computational biology, cancer genomics, mutagenesis, ageing and bioinformatics. Alexandrov is one of the co-leaders of the Mutographs of Cancer project, a £20 million Grand Challenge Project funded by Cancer Research UK "to fill in the missing gaps to identify the unknown cancer-causing factors and reveal how they lead to cancer."
