= Sultan bin Turki Al Sedairy =

Saudi scientist (born 1955)

Sultan bin Turki bin Nasser Al-Sedairy
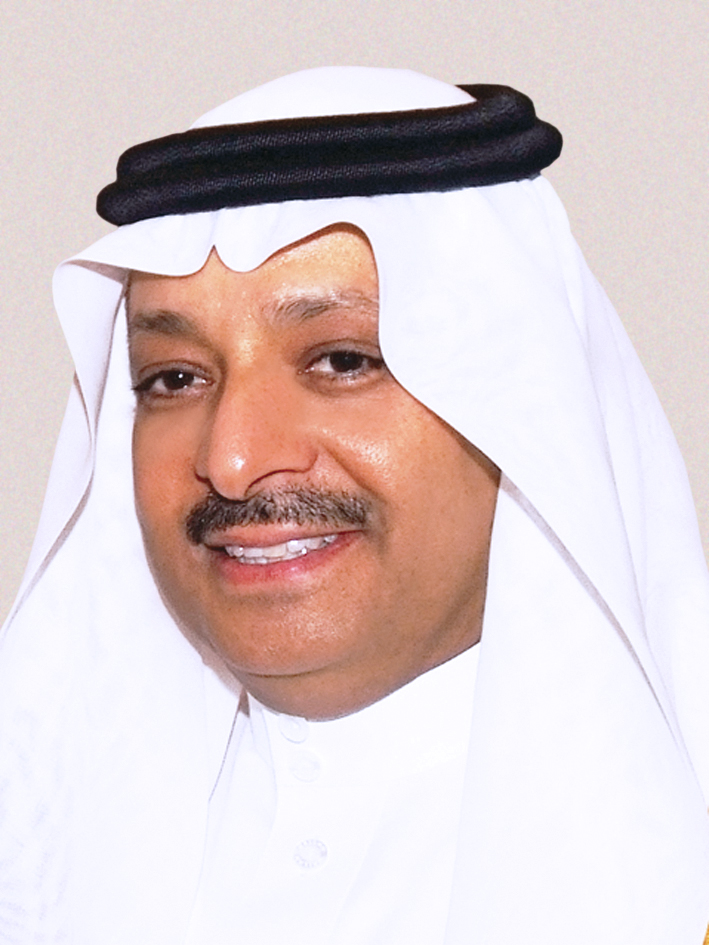
- A photo of Al-Sedairy
- Born: 1955 (age 70–71); Riyadh, Saudi Arabia
- Education: Columbia University, New York
- Occupations: Executive Director of the King Faisal Specialist Hospital and Research Centre and Chief Executive Director of the King Salman Center for Disability Research

Sultan Al-Sedairy (Arabic: سلطان بن تركي بن ناصر السديري) is a Saudi scientist born in 1955 in Riyadh, Saudi Arabia. He currently holds the following positions: Research Centre executive director (King Faisal Specialist Hospital and Research Centre, since 1996), chief executive director (King Salman Center for Disability Research, since 2004), and professor, College of Medicine (Alfaisal University, since 2011).

== Education ==
Al-Sedairy received his Bachelor of Science degree in Biology/Chemistry in 1979 from the University of Puget Sound (Tacoma, Washington). He received his diploma in Medical Technology in 1981 from the Cleveland Clinic Education Foundation (Cleveland, Ohio). He completed his MA in Pathology in 1982, his MPhil in 1984, and his PhD in 1987 (Pathobiology, with focus on tumor immunology), Thesis: Human Tumor Antigens Identified with Monoclonal Antibodies all from Columbia University (New York). His post-doctoral fellowship was completed under the supervision of Prof. H. Vogel in 1987 (March – October) at the Department of Pathology, College of Physicians and Surgeons (Columbia University).

== Leadership ==
=== National ===
Member, Biotechnology Committee of the King Abdulaziz City for Science and Technology
Member, Kingdom's Experts' Council in the field of Medical Science and Technology
Member, Oversight Committee for the National Strategy for Science and Technology and Innovation
Member, Technology Advisory Council, Saudi Technology Development and Investment Company (TAQNIA)

=== International ===
Vice President, International Network for Cancer Treatment and Research
Member, Governing Council, International Network for Cancer Treatment and Research
Member of the Tumour Biology Committee, International Union Against Cancer
Member of the Board of Trustees, Dubai Harvard Foundation
Member of the Scientific Advisory Committee, Dubai Harvard Foundation
Member of the Scientific Committee, InNaBioSanté Foundation
Member of the Executive Committee, International Cancer Genome Consortium
Member of the International Scientific Steering Committee, International Cancer Genome Consortium
Member of the Executive Committee, International Rare Diseases Research Consortium
Member of the Advisory Board, KACST-UCSD Joint Center for Excellence in Nanomedicine & Engineering, University of California, San Diego, USA
Fellow, Royal Society of Medicine
Member of the Board of Directors, Taqnia International

== Research ==
Al-Sedairy's research interest is in tumor and transplantation immunology and has published over 150 full-length papers and meeting abstracts. He is a Visiting Research Scientist at the Transplantation Research Centre at Children's Hospital at Harvard Medical School (Boston). He chairs the Research Advisory Council at KFSH&RC and helped establish local guidelines for medical research pertaining to scientific and ethical values. He supports increased awareness to the benefits of healthcare research and biotechnology and towards ensuring the availability of resources and opportunities for the proliferation of research.

== Gender and Disability Issues ==
Al-Sedairy has helped advance several gender and disability-related initiatives. Some of these include the establishment of a national network of female Saudi scientists, the establishment of a national newborn screening program, and initiatives for the benefit of people with learning difficulties.
