= Allan Bradley =

British geneticist

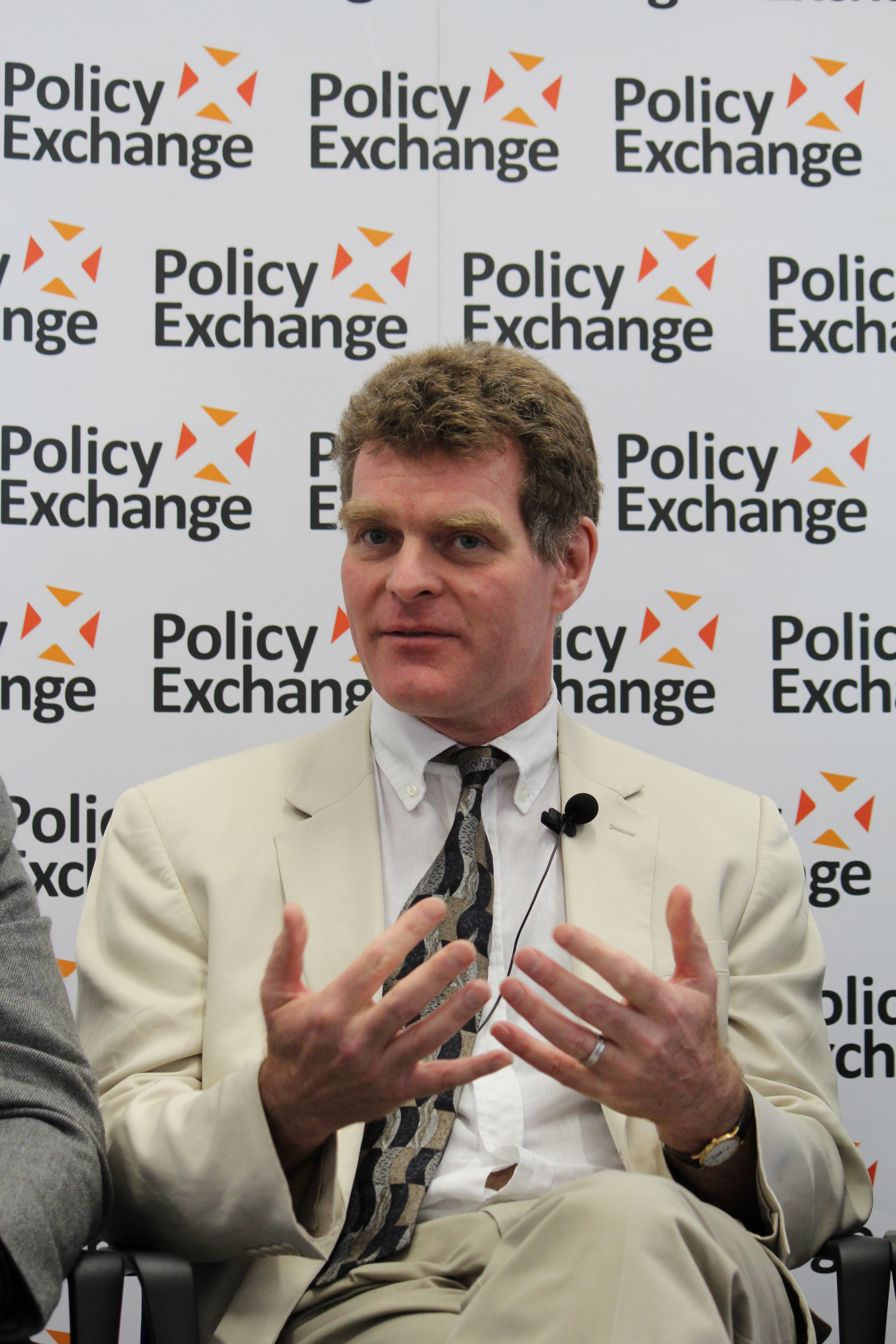
- Allan Bradley at the launch of the Shakespeare review, organised by Policy Exchange
- Born: Allan Bradley
- Education: University of Cambridge (BA, MA, PhD)
- Known for: Embryonic stem cells
- Awards: Searle Scholar (1988); EMBO member (2006); FRS (2002)
- Scientific career
- Fields: Mouse genomics
- Workplaces: Baylor College of Medicine; Wellcome Trust Sanger Institute; Howard Hughes Medical Institute
- Thesis: Isolation characterisation and developmental potential of murine embryo-derived stem cells (1986)
- Doctoral advisor: Martin Evans
- Website: sanger.ac.uk/person/bradley-allan/

Allan Bradley FRS is a British geneticist who served as Director of the Wellcome Trust Sanger Institute from 2000-2010.

== Education ==
Bradley was educated at the University of Cambridge where he earned Bachelor of Arts, Master of Arts and PhD degrees in genetics from Trinity College, Cambridge gained while working in the laboratory of Martin Evans.

== Career ==
Following his PhD, Bradley was appointed assistant professor at Baylor College of Medicine, beginning in 1987 where he was also a Searle Scholar in 1988. Bradley was appointed a Howard Hughes Medical Institute Investigator in 1993 and director of the Wellcome Trust Sanger Institute, from October 2000 (preceded by John Sulston) to April 2010, succeeded by Michael Stratton. He and his research team moved to the University of Cambridge in 2019.

== Awards and honours ==
Bradley won a 1994 DeBakey Award and was elected a Fellow of the Royal Society (FRS) in 2002. His certificate of election reads:

"Allan Bradley has made important contributions to the technique of mutation of endogenous genes in mice, an approach that has opened up a new era of research in biology. It is impossible to open an issue of a major journal nowadays without coming across an article that describes the consequences of mutating an endogenous gene in mice. The generation of these mice is based on concepts and techniques that can be traced back to experiments performed and published by Bradley fifteen years ago. In the years since, he has not only used ES cell technology to provide key information on the functions of many genes including several important tumour suppressor genes, but has also continued to improve and develop the techniques, technology, and tools for genetic manipulation in the mouse. Today, mice can be generated with changes as subtle as an alteration in a single nucleotide or as extensive as the deletion of millions of base pairs. These alterations will gain increasing importance in genetic experiments aimed at understanding the function of genes in the mammalian genome in the post genome era."

Non-profit organization positions
| Preceded by John Sulston | Director of the Wellcome Trust Sanger Institute; 2000–2010 | Succeeded by Michael Stratton |
