= Cancer Genome Project =

The Cancer Genome Project is part of the cancer, aging, and somatic mutation research based at the Wellcome Trust Sanger Institute in the United Kingdom. It aims to identify sequence variants/mutations critical in the development of human cancers. Like The Cancer Genome Atlas project within the United States, the Cancer Genome Project represents an effort in the war on cancer to improve cancer diagnosis, treatment, and prevention through a better understanding of the molecular basis of the disease. The Cancer Genome Project was launched by Michael Stratton in 2000, and Peter Campbell is now the group leader of the project. The project works to combine knowledge of the human genome sequence with high throughput mutation detection techniques.

The project operates within the scope of the International Cancer Genome Consortium, working with the other participating organizations and countries to build a database of genomic changes present in different types of cancer. The somatic mutation information gathered by the project can be located in the COSMIC database. The Wellcome Trust Sanger Institute's project currently has several internal partners that each focus on different types of cancer and mutagenesis utilizing different methods. Research goes beyond just sequencing to include therapeutic biomarker discoveries made utilizing bioinformatics programs. Among these discoveries are drug sensitivity biomarkers and inhibitor biomarkers. These discoveries paired with the evolution of DNA sequencing technologies to next-generation sequencing techniques, are important in potential disease treatment and may even help lead to more personalized medicine for cancer patients.

== Goals ==
The goals of the project are to help sequence and catalog different cancer genomes. Beyond just sequencing the project's internal partners each have different areas of focus that will assist in the project's overall goal of determining unique ways for early detection of cancer, better prevention, and improved treatment for patients.

== Partners ==
The following groups are internal partners at the Wellcome Trust Sanger Institute with labs involved with the Cancer Genome Project that are each carrying out different areas of research involving cancer genomics, other diseases, and therapy improvements for both of the aforementioned.

=== Garnett Group ===
The Garnett group is headed by Mathew Garnett. They work to improve current cancer therapies by determining how alterations in the DNA of cells results in cancer and the implications this has involving patient responses to therapy and its potential improvement. The current research being carried out by the group includes the genomics of drug sensitivity, mapping synthetic-lethal dependencies in cancer cells, a new generation of organoid cancer models, and precision organoid models to study cancer gene function.

=== Jackson Group ===
The Jackson group is led by Steve Jackson, and their research focuses on how cells utilize DNA-damage response (DDR) to discover and mend damaged cellular DNA. The research they are conducting have large implications involving diseases that result from loss of function of the DDR system, such as cancer, neurodegenerative diseases, infertility, immunodeficiency, and premature aging.

=== Liu Group ===
Pentao Liu leads the Liu group, which utilizes genetics, genomics, and cell biology in mice to study the role of gene functions in the development of normal cells and tissues as well as the development of various diseased cells and tissue, including cancer. The group invests a large interest in lineage choice, stem cell self-renewal, and differentiation, which would have implications in early detection, prevention, and therapy options for cancer and other genetic diseases.

=== McDermott Group ===
Ultan McDermott heads the McDermott Group. The group utilizes next-generation sequencing technologies, genetic screens, and bioinformatics to increase the knowledge of the effect that cancer genomes have on drug sensitivity and resistance in relation to patients. The different types of genetic screens being used include CRISPR, chemical mutagenesis, and RNAi. The main areas of focus by the group involve the pharmacogenomics of cancer and genetic screens to build a reserve of drug resistances in cancer.

=== Nik-Zainal Group ===
The leader of the Nik-Zainal group is Serena Nik-Zainal. The group uses computational methods to identify the unique signature of mutagenesis in somatic cells to help increase the understanding of how mutations in DNA contribute to aging and cancer. As more cancer genomes are sequenced the information the group generates will encompass a more robust collection, allowing for understanding of how mutations lead to different types and even subtypes of cancer.

=== Vassiliou Group ===
The Vassiliou group is led by George Vassiliou, and they focus on hematological cancer. The group studies how different genes and their pathways assist in the evolution of blood cancers, with an ultimate goal of developing treatment that will increase the quality and length of life of patients.

=== Voet Group ===
Thierry Voet leads the Voet group. The group utilizes single cell genome variants and its transcribed RNA to study the rate of mutation, genomic instability in gametogenesis and embryogenesis, and the effects of cellular heterogeneity on health and disease.

== Research ==
In an attempt to better understand the mechanics of the mutations that lead to the development of cancer the Nik-Zainal group carried out a study that involved the cataloging of the somatic mutations for 21 different breast cancers. The group then utilized mathematical methods to help determine the unique mutational signatures of the underlying processes leading to the evolution from healthy to diseased tissue for each of the sampled cancers. The results showed that the mutations included several single and double nucleotide substitutions that were able to be differentiated. The unique mutations for each cancer allowed for the 21 samples to be categorized based on type and subtype of cancer, showing a relationship between mutations and the type of resulting cancer. While the group was able to identify these mutations they were unable to determine the underlying mechanisms resulting in them.

The McDermott group in participation with other labs worked to find new treatment possibilities for acute myeloid leukemia (AML), an aggressive cancer with a poor prognosis. They accomplished this by designing a CRISPR genome wide screening tool to locate areas in the genome that would be more susceptible to treatment in the AML cells. The research identified 492 essential genes to the function of the AML cells that would be accessible to being therapeutic targets. The group validated the obtained results by genetic and pharmacological inhibition on select genes. Inhibition of one of the selected genes, KAT2A, was able to suppress the growth of the AML cells across several genotypes will leaving noncancerous cells undamaged. The results from this study propose several promising therapeutic options for AML that will need to farther investigated.

== See also ==
- Cancer genome sequencing
- The Cancer Genome Atlas
- International Cancer Genome Consortium
- COSMIC cancer database
