= APOBEC3D =

Protein-coding gene in the species Homo sapiens

Identifiers
- Aliases: APOBEC3D, A3D, APOBEC3DE, APOBEC3E, ARP6, apolipoprotein B mRNA editing enzyme catalytic subunit 3D, A3DE
- External IDs: OMIM: 609900; GeneCards: APOBEC3D

Gene location (Human)
Chr.	Chromosome 22 (human)
Band	22q13.1	Start	39,021,113 bp
Band	22q13.1	End	39,033,277 bp
RNA expression pattern
Bgee	Human / Mouse (ortholog); Top expressed in: granulocyte; lymph node; spleen; bone marrow cell; blood; appendix; right uterine tube; monocyte; gallbladder; rectum / n/a; More reference expression data
BioGPS	n/a
Gene ontology
Molecular function	hydrolase activity, acting on carbon-nitrogen (but not peptide) bonds, in cyclic amidines; zinc ion binding; catalytic activity; hydrolase activity; metal ion binding; RNA binding; cytidine deaminase activity
Cellular component	cytoplasm; P-body; nucleus
Biological process	negative regulation of transposition; innate immune response; defense response to virus; DNA cytosine deamination; negative regulation of single stranded viral RNA replication via double stranded DNA intermediate; immune system process; cytidine deamination; cytidine to uridine editing; DNA demethylation
Sources:Amigo / QuickGO
Orthologs
Databases	NCBI: entry; OMA: entry
Species	Human	Mouse
Entrez	140564	n/a
Ensembl	ENSG00000243811	n/a
UniProt	B2CML4	n/a
RefSeq (mRNA)	NM_152426; NM_001363781	n/a
RefSeq (protein)	NP_689639; NP_001350710	n/a
Location (UCSC)	Chr 22: 39.02 – 39.03 Mb	n/a
PubMed search		n/a
- Wikidata
View/Edit Human

Probable DNA dC->dU-editing enzyme APOBEC-3D is a protein that in humans is encoded by the APOBEC3D gene.

This gene is a member of the cytidine deaminase gene family. It is one of seven related genes or pseudogenes found in a cluster, thought to result from gene duplication, on chromosome 22. Members of the cluster encode proteins that are structurally and functionally related to the C to U RNA-editing cytidine deaminase APOBEC1 and inhibit retroviruses, such as HIV, by deaminating cytosine residues in nascent retroviral cDNA.

== Function ==
APOBEC3D is one of the human APOBEC3 enzymes involved in restriction of HIV-1. HIV-1 Vif counteracts APOBEC3D by recruiting ubiquitin-ligase machinery that leads to its polyubiquitination and proteasomal degradation in virus-producing cells.
