= APOBEC3A =

Protein-coding gene in the species Homo sapiens

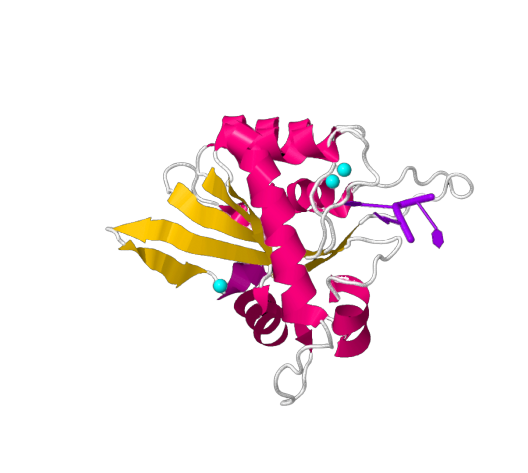

Identifiers
- Aliases: APOBEC3A, A3A, ARP3, PHRBN, bK150C2.1, apolipoprotein B mRNA editing enzyme catalytic subunit 3A
- External IDs: OMIM: 607109; GeneCards: APOBEC3A
Available structures
PDB	Human UniProt search: PDBe RCSB
PDB	List of PDB id codes 2M65, 4XXO
Enzyme activity
EC #	BRENDA	ExPASy	KEGG	MetaCyc
3.5.4.38	↗	↗	↗	↗

Gene location (Human)
Chr.	Chromosome 22 (human)
Band	22q13.1	Start	38,952,741 bp
Band	22q13.1	End	38,992,778 bp
RNA expression pattern
Bgee	Human / Mouse (ortholog); Top expressed in: monocyte; palpebral conjunctiva; granulocyte; blood; spleen; periodontal fiber; bone marrow cell; right lung; amniotic fluid; upper lobe of left lung / n/a; More reference expression data
BioGPS	n/a
Gene ontology
Molecular function	hydrolase activity, acting on carbon-nitrogen (but not peptide) bonds, in cyclic amidines; cytidine deaminase activity; zinc ion binding; hydrolase activity; protein binding; catalytic activity; metal ion binding; deoxycytidine deaminase activity; RNA binding
Cellular component	cytoplasm; nucleus
Biological process	cellular response to xenobiotic stimulus; negative regulation of transposition; DNA demethylation; negative regulation of viral genome replication; innate immune response; defense response to virus; DNA cytosine deamination; immune system process; cytidine deamination; cytidine to uridine editing
Sources:Amigo / QuickGO
Orthologs
Databases	NCBI: entry; OMA: entry
Species	Human	Mouse
Entrez	200315	n/a
Ensembl	ENSG00000128383; ENSG00000262156	n/a
UniProt	P31941	n/a
RefSeq (mRNA)	NM_145699; NM_001270406	n/a
RefSeq (protein)	NP_001257335; NP_663745	n/a
Location (UCSC)	Chr 22: 38.95 – 38.99 Mb	n/a
PubMed search		n/a
- Wikidata
View/Edit Human

Apolipoprotein B mRNA editing enzyme, catalytic polypeptide-like 3A, also known as APOBEC3A, or A3A is a gene of the APOBEC3 family found in primates, including humans, and some other mammals. It is a single-domain DNA cytidine deaminase with antiviral effects. While other members of the family such as APOBEC3G are believed to act by editing ssDNA by removing an amino group from cytosine in DNA, introducing a cytosine to uracil change which can ultimately lead to a cytosine to thymine mutation, one study suggests that APOBEC3A can inhibit parvoviruses by another mechanism. The cellular function of APOBEC3A is likely to be the destruction of foreign DNA through extensive deamination of cytosine.

This gene is a member of the polynucleotide cytosine deaminase gene family. It is one of seven related genes or pseudogenes found in a cluster, thought to result from gene duplication, on chromosome 22. Members of the cluster encode proteins that are structurally and functionally related to the C to U RNA-editing cytidine deaminase APOBEC1. The APOBEC3 family of DNA editing enzymes are thought to be part of the innate immune system by restricting retroviruses, mobile genetic elements like retrotransposons and endogenous retroviruses. In addition, APOBEC3A is an important restrictive factor for HIV-1 and other retroviruses such as murine leukemia virus,

== Structure ==
The basic structure APOBEC3A consists of a 5 stranded central β-sheet surrounded by 6 α-helices and a single catalytically active zinc finger domain. Similar to all APOBEC3 catalytic domains, the domain is a H_{A}E_{x28}C_{x2-4}C zinc binding motif. In such motifs, histidine residues (or cysteine residues in RNA cytidine deaminases) coordinate the zinc ion while a glutamic acid stabilizes the transition state and the proton shuttle. The zinc ion, in this case, is specifically coordinated by residues H70, C101 and C106.

=== A3A-ssDNA structure ===
Single stranded DNA, abbreviated ssDNA, is the substrate that is catalyzed in the C→U deamination reaction of APOBEC3A.

== Activity ==
A3A has the highest catalytic activity among the APOBEC3 protein family.

=== mRNA editing activity ===
A3A was first found to induce an alternative form of the mRNA editing, G>A, in Wilms' Tumor-1 (WT1) mRNA in cord blood mononuclear cells, particularly in the genomic polymorphic sites, apparently reflecting an amination process rather than a de-amination one. This was soon followed by a study showing A3A induce canonical widespread C>U mRNA editing in human monocytes and macrophages.

=== Effect of pH on APOBEC3A ===
APOBEC3A functions best at an acidic pH, with maximal catalytic activity at pH 5.5. Another protein of the APOBEC family very similar to A3A, APOBEC3B, showed little activity at pH 4.5 and 4.0 and a similar assumption can be made of A3A activity at these lower pH levels.

A3A affinity for ssDNA is also pH dependent and closely correlated to the deamination activity of APOBEC3A. The enzyme has the highest affinity for ssDNA at pH 5.5 demonstrating that A3A's maximal catalytic activity and highest affinity for ssDNA occur at a similar pH.

== Mechanism of Action ==
A3A has become an increasingly widely studied A3 because of its high catalytic activity compared to its family members and its relatively unknown mechanisms compared to more popular APOBEC3's such as APOBEC3G.

=== Context dependent binding to ssDNA ===
The binding of APOBEC3A to its substrate ssDNA is highly dependent on its surrounding nucleotides. The specificity for binding to its target deoxycytidine increases more than ten-fold when the target deoxycytidine is surrounded by deoxythymidine nucleotides.
