= King Salman Award for Disability Research =

- Awarded for: Outstanding contributions in the field of disability
- Country: Saudi Arabia
- Reward(s): Certificate, Medal and 500,000 Saudi riyal, approx. US$133,450
- Website: www.ksadr.org.sa/en

The King Salman Award for Disability Research is an internationally recognized prize that is awarded to notable individuals who contributed to knowledge and scientific research in the field of disability. The prize was established by King Salman Center for Disability Research.

== Areas and Nominations ==
There are three main areas of the award in which nominations are accepted. These areas are Health and Medical Sciences, Pedagogical and Educational Sciences, and Rehabilitative and Social Sciences. The Nominations are accepted from local and international research and scientific organizations as well as academic departments and universities.

== Award Value ==
The laureates are given the following rewards:

- A certificate with their names and works.
- An honorary medal.
- 500,000 Saudi Riyals (US$133,450).

== List of laureates ==
Year	Health and Medical Sciences	Pedagogical and Educational Sciences	Rehabilitative and Social Sciences
2014	Fowzan S. Alkuraya	Ann P. Turnbull Rutherford Turnbull	Hugh M. Herr Prof. Margaret G. Stineman
