= APOBEC2 =

Protein-coding gene in the species Homo sapiens

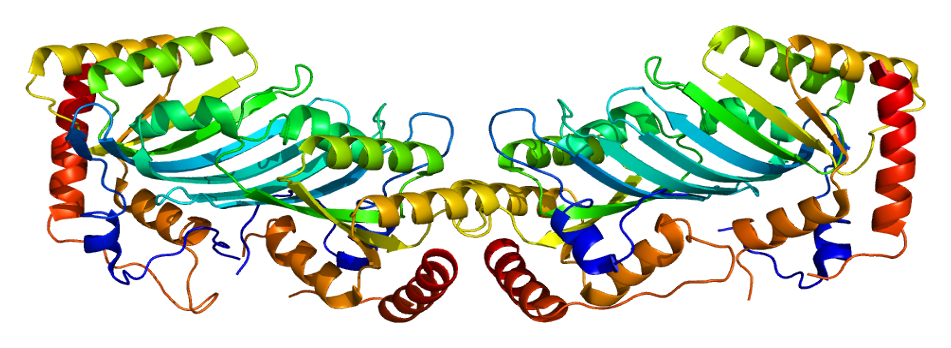

Identifiers
- Aliases: APOBEC2, ARCD1, ARP1, apolipoprotein B mRNA editing enzyme catalytic subunit 2
- External IDs: OMIM: 604797; MGI: 1343178; GeneCards: APOBEC2
Available structures
PDB	Ortholog search: PDBe RCSB
PDB	List of PDB id codes 2NYT
Enzyme activity
EC #	BRENDA	ExPASy	KEGG	MetaCyc
3.5.4.36	↗	↗	↗	↗

Gene location (Human)
Chr.	Chromosome 6 (human)
Band	6p21.1	Start	41,053,202 bp
Band	6p21.1	End	41,064,891 bp

Gene location (Mouse)
Chr.	Chromosome 17 (mouse)
Band	17 C|17 24.02 cM	Start	48,726,259 bp
Band	17 C|17 24.02 cM	End	48,739,958 bp
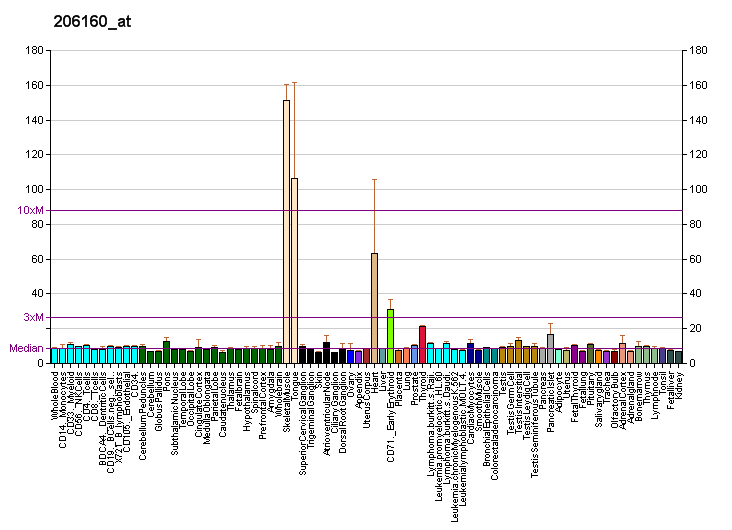
RNA expression pattern
Bgee	Human / Mouse (ortholog); Top expressed in: Skeletal muscle tissue of rectus abdominis; biceps brachii; triceps brachii muscle; Skeletal muscle tissue of biceps brachii; muscle of thigh; glutes; thoracic diaphragm; vastus lateralis muscle; deltoid muscle; apex of heart / Top expressed in: quadriceps femoris muscle; muscle of thigh; zone of skin; esophagus; skeletal muscle tissue; heart; lip; epithelium of urethra; ejaculatory duct; epithelium of male urethra; More reference expression data
BioGPS	More reference expression data
Gene ontology
Molecular function	hydrolase activity, acting on carbon-nitrogen (but not peptide) bonds, in cyclic amidines; zinc ion binding; catalytic activity; hydrolase activity; metal ion binding; RNA binding; cytidine deaminase activity; identical protein binding
Cellular component	nucleus; cytoplasm
Biological process	DNA demethylation; mRNA processing; mRNA modification; cytidine deamination; cytidine to uridine editing
Sources:Amigo / QuickGO
Orthologs
Databases	NCBI: entry; OMA: entry
Species	Human	Mouse
Entrez	10930	11811
Ensembl	ENSG00000124701	ENSMUSG00000040694
UniProt	Q9Y235	Q9WV35
RefSeq (mRNA)	NM_006789	NM_009694
RefSeq (protein)	NP_006780	NP_033824
Location (UCSC)	Chr 6: 41.05 – 41.06 Mb	Chr 17: 48.73 – 48.74 Mb
PubMed search
- Wikidata
View/Edit Human	View/Edit Mouse

Probable C->U-editing enzyme APOBEC-2 is a protein that in humans is encoded by the APOBEC2 gene.
