= Sheikh Hassan Enany =

Sheikh Hassan Enany, born 1943 in Mecca, Saudi Arabia, is the Chairman of the Enany Group, a consortium of more than 100 companies operating in the Middle East, Europe and the United States.

== Business Interests ==
In December 2009, Sheikh Enany headed a delegation of 10 Middle East businessmen, which was invited by Kuala Lumpur Mayor Datuk Ahmad Fuad Ismail for a meeting in his office at the Kuala Lumpur City Hall tower in Jalan Raja Laut to discuss possible ventures in Malaysia and Saudi Arabia.

=== Enany Group ===
The group has more than 100 companies and businesses in the Middle East, Europe and the United States. The investment arm handles various portfolios including construction, investment and financial advisory, real estate development, technology, trade, agro-business and computer software management and consultancy.

== Philanthropy ==
In 1995, Sheikh Enany funded the establishment of the CMSR unit at Stanford, one of the first of its kind in the world. As well as treating cancer, the radio surgery technology has been used for treating Parkinson's disease.

In 1989, Sheikh Enany funded the Islamic Studies programme that was introduced at Catholic University in the US. In 1985, Sheikh Enany funded the construction of the Mosque of Hassan Enany on the coast of Jeddah, Saudi Arabia.

Sheikh Hassan Enany is also a founder of the Prince Salman Center for Disability Research in Saudi Arabia.
