= APOBEC3B =

Protein-coding gene in the species Homo sapiens

Identifiers
- Aliases: APOBEC3B, A3B, APOBEC1L, ARCD3, ARP4, DJ742C19.2, PHRBNL, bK150C2.2, apolipoprotein B mRNA editing enzyme catalytic subunit 3B
- External IDs: OMIM: 607110; MGI: 1933111; GeneCards: APOBEC3B
Available structures
PDB	Ortholog search: PDBe RCSB
PDB	List of PDB id codes 5CQD, 5CQH, 5CQI, 5CQK, 2NBQ
Enzyme activity
EC #	BRENDA	ExPASy	KEGG	MetaCyc
3.5.4.38	↗	↗	↗	↗

Gene location (Human)
Chr.	Chromosome 22 (human)
Band	22q13.1	Start	38,982,347 bp
Band	22q13.1	End	38,992,804 bp

Gene location (Mouse)
Chr.	Chromosome 15 (mouse)
Band	15 E1|15 37.85 cM	Start	79,775,860 bp
Band	15 E1|15 37.85 cM	End	79,800,107 bp
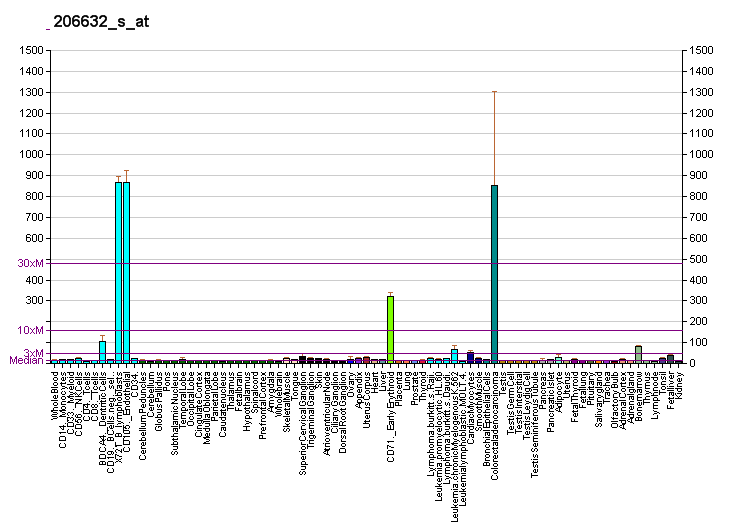
RNA expression pattern
Bgee	Human / Mouse (ortholog); Top expressed in: gonad; mucosa of transverse colon; bone marrow; rectum; blood; bone marrow cell; islet of Langerhans; stromal cell of endometrium; duodenum; appendix / Top expressed in: mesenteric lymph nodes; thymus; granulocyte; bone marrow; embryo; aortic valve; spleen; subcutaneous adipose tissue; epithelium of urethra; ascending aorta; More reference expression data
BioGPS	More reference expression data
Gene ontology
Molecular function	hydrolase activity, acting on carbon-nitrogen (but not peptide) bonds, in cyclic amidines; zinc ion binding; catalytic activity; hydrolase activity; metal ion binding; deoxycytidine deaminase activity; RNA binding; cytidine deaminase activity
Cellular component	nucleus; cytoplasm
Biological process	negative regulation of transposition; innate immune response; immune system process; defense response to virus; cytidine deamination; cytidine to uridine editing; DNA demethylation
Sources:Amigo / QuickGO
Orthologs
Databases	NCBI: entry; OMA: entry
Species	Human	Mouse
Entrez	9582	80287
Ensembl	ENSG00000179750	ENSMUSG00000009585
UniProt	Q9UH17	Q99J72
RefSeq (mRNA)	NM_004900; NM_001270411	NM_001160415; NM_030255; NM_001347041
RefSeq (protein)	NP_001257340; NP_004891	NP_001153887; NP_001333970; NP_084531
Location (UCSC)	Chr 22: 38.98 – 38.99 Mb	Chr 15: 79.78 – 79.8 Mb
PubMed search
- Wikidata
View/Edit Human	View/Edit Mouse

Probable DNA dC->dU-editing enzyme APOBEC-3B is a protein that in humans is encoded by the APOBEC3B gene.

This gene is a member of the cytidine deaminase gene family. It is one of seven related genes or pseudogenes found in a cluster, thought to result from gene duplication, on chromosome 22. Members of the cluster encode proteins that are structurally and functionally related to the C to U RNA-editing cytidine deaminase APOBEC1. It is thought that the proteins may be RNA editing enzymes and have roles in growth or cell cycle control. This gene along with APOBEC3A have been in recent years found associated with mutagenesis of several cancers. The APOBEC3A and APOBEC3B proteins can cause specific mutations in cancer genomes called APOBEC mutagenesis and several factors including genetic and environmental influence this mutation pattern among patients specifically in bladder and breast cancer. This gene is also overexpressed in multiple myeloma, possibly aiding its formation.
