= International Cancer Genome Consortium =

The International Cancer Genome Consortium (ICGC) is a voluntary scientific organization that provides a forum for collaboration among the world's leading cancer and genomic researchers. The ICGC was launched in 2008 to coordinate large-scale cancer genome studies in tumours from 50 cancer types and/or subtypes that are of main importance across the globe.

Systematic studies of more than 25,000 cancer genomes at the genomic, epigenomic and transcriptomic levels will reveal the repertoire of oncogenic mutations, uncover traces of the mutagenic influences, define clinically relevant subtypes for prognosis and therapeutic management, and enable the development of new cancer therapies.

The ICGC incorporates data from The Cancer Genome Atlas (TCGA) and the Sanger Cancer Genome Project.

Professor Andrew Biankin AO, Regius Professor and Director of the Wolfson Wohl Cancer Research Centre at the University of Glasgow has been Executive Director and Chairman from 2018.

== Goals ==
The ICGC is one of the most ambitious biomedical research efforts since the Human Genome Project. The consortium will help to coordinate current and future large-scale projects to understand the genomic changes involved in cancers of global concern. The catalogues produced by ICGC members will be made rapidly and freely available to qualified researchers, which will enable scientists around the globe to use the new information to develop better ways of diagnosing, treating and preventing many types of cancer.

The aim of the ICGC is to provide a comprehensive description of the somatic (non-inherited) genomic abnormalities present in the broad range of human tumors. Given our current knowledge of the heterogeneity of tumor types and subtypes, the ICGC set a goal of coordinating approximately 50 projects, each of which will generate the genomic analyses on approximately 500 cancer samples of each class. It is well recognized, however, that cancer is highly heterogeneous and hundreds of types/subtypes can be defined. Therefore, the stated goal of 50 ICGC projects is not intended to, and cannot, exhaustively cover the full spectrum of cancer types.

ICGC Funding and Research members proposing a project must agree to the ICGC’s policies, which include requirements for rapid data release, for rigorous quality standards and for protection of study participants.

== Structure and funding ==
ICGC is funded by participating nations, each of which focuses on one or more forms of cancer, with the goal of mapping the genomes of at least 50 types of cancer. The consortium's secretariat is at the Ontario Institute for Cancer Research in Toronto, Canada, which will also operate the data coordination center. The provincial Government of Ontario provided funding of $40 million, and each participating funding member is expected to contribute $20 million toward each project. In 2009 the German Cancer Aid supported one ICGC-project with 7.9 million Euro. This was the highest amount a private organization gave. The money is donated by German people.

ICGC membership is open to all entities that agree to follow its principles and guidelines. The ICGC has received commitments from funding organizations in Asia, Australia, Europe and North America for 47 project teams in 15 jurisdictions to study over 21,000 tumor genomes. Projects that are currently funded are examining tumors affecting the bladder, blood, bone, brain, breast, cervix, colon, head and neck, kidney, liver, lung, oral cavity, ovary, pancreas, prostate, rectum, skin, soft tissues, stomach, thyroid and uterus. Over time, additional nations and organizations are anticipated to join the ICGC. The genomic analyses of tumors conducted by ICGC members in Australia and Canada (pancreatic cancer), China (gastric cancer), France (liver cancer), Germany (brain cancer), Japan (liver cancer), Spain (blood cancer), the UK (blood, breast, lung and skin cancer) and the USA (blood, brain, breast, colon, kidney, lung, ovarian, rectal, stomach and uterine cancer) are now available through the Data Coordination Center housed on the ICGC website.

=== Members of the executive committee ===
- Australia: Warwick Anderson, National Health and Medical Research Council
- Canada: Thomas Hudson, Ontario Institute for Cancer Research, Susan Langlois, Prostate Cancer Canada and Cindy Bell, Genome Canada
- China: Henry Yang and Youyong Lu, Chinese Cancer Genome Consortium
- European Commission: Jacques Remacle, Patrik Kolar and Iiro Eerola
- France: Fabien Calvo, Institut National du Cancer (INCa)
- Germany: Axel Aretz and Frank Laplace, Federal Ministry of Education and Research. Gerd Nettekoven, Deutsche Krebshilfe (German Cancer Aid), founded bei Mildred Scheel, Bonn and Berlin.
- India: M.K. Bhan and T.S. Rao, Ministry of Science & Technology, Department of Biotechnology
- Italy: Maria Cristina Falvella Italian Ministry of Education, University and Research (MIUR) and Giampaolo Tortora University of Verona
- Japan: Sonoko Watanabe, RIKEN, Tatsuhiro Shibata, National Cancer Center Sachiko Suematsu, Rie Tsuchida and Hideo Eno National Institute of Biomedical Innovation
- Mexico: Miguel Betancourt Instituto Carlos Slim de la Salud
- Saudi Arabia: Sultan bin Turki Al Sedairy King Faisal Specialist Hospital and Research Centre
- South Korea: Hyung-Lae Kim National Center for Cancer Genomics, National Project for Personalized Genomic Medicine, South Korean Ministry of Health and Welfare
- Spain: Elias Campo and Rosa Rodríguez Bernabé, Spanish Ministry of Science and Innovation
- United Kingdom: Michael Dunn and Michael Stratton, The Wellcome Trust Sanger Institute
- United Kingdom: David Scott and Nic Jones, Cancer Research UK
- United States: Jean Claude Zenklusen and Louis Staudt, National Cancer Institute Eric Green, and Carolyn Hutter, National Human Genome Research Institute
- United Kingdom: Rosalind Eeles, Institute of Cancer Research
- United States: Olivier Elemento, Englander Institute for Precision Medicine at Weill Cornell Medicine
- South Korea: Kyu-Sung Lee, Samsung Medical Centre Research, Sungkyunkwan University School of Medicine
- South Korea: Eun Sook Lee, National Cancer Center
- China: Huanming Yang, BGI Genomics
- South Korea: Sung-Soo Yoon Seoul National University Hospital, Seoul National University College of Medicine
- Japan: Takayuki Yoshino National Cancer Center Hospital East
- China: Qimin Zhan Peking University Health Science Center

Representatives with observer status:

- Hong Kong: Joseph Lee, Hong Kong University of Science and Technology

== Current research projects ==
Each participating country has a particular tumor type as its primary research target:

- Australia: Pancreatic cancer – Ductal adenocarcinoma and ovarian cancer – Serous cystadenocarcinoma
- Canada: Pancreatic cancer – Ductal adenocarcinoma and prostate cancer – adenocarcinoma
- China: Gastric cancer – Intestinal- and diffuse-type
- European Union/France: Renal cancer – Renal cell carcinoma (Focus on but not limited to clear cell subtype)
- European Union/United Kingdom: Breast cancer – ER+ve, HER2-ve
- France: Breast cancer – Subtype defined by an amplification of the HER2 gene
- France: Liver cancer – Hepatocellular carcinoma (Secondary to alcohol and adiposity)
- Germany: Pediatric brain tumors – Medulloblastoma and pediatric pilocytic astrocytoma and malignant lymphoma and prostate cancer
- India: Oral cancer – Gingivobuccal
- Italy: Rare pancreatic tumors – Enteropancreatic endocrine tumors and rare pancreatic exocrine tumors
- Japan: Liver cancer – Hepatocellular carcinoma (Virus associated)
- Spain: Chronic lymphocytic leukemia – CLL with mutated and unmutated IgVH
- United Kingdom: Breast cancer – Triple Negative/lobular/other
- United States: lung squamous cell carcinoma, kidney papillary carcinoma, clear cell kidney carcinoma, breast ductal carcinoma, renal cell carcinoma, cervical cancer (squamous), colon adenocarcinoma, stomach adenocarcinoma, rectal carcinoma, hepatocellular carcinoma, Head and neck (oral) squamous cell carcinoma, thyroid carcinoma, bladder urothelial carcinoma – nonpapillary, uterine corpus (endometrial carcinoma), pancreatic ductal adenocarcinoma, acute myeloid leukemia, prostate adenocarcinoma, lung adenocarcinoma, cutaneous melanoma, breast lobular carcinoma and lower grade glioma, esophageal carcinoma, ovarian serous cystadenocarcinoma, lung squamous cell carcinoma, adrenocortical carcinoma, Diffuse Large B-cell lymphoma, paraganglioma & pheochromocytoma, cholangiocarcinoma, uterine carcinosarcoma, uveal melanoma, thymoma, sarcoma, mesothelioma, and testicular germ cell cancer.

== Future work ==
=== ICGCmed ===
Within the context of massive international sequencing efforts, and in anticipation of the new era of precision medicine, The International Cancer Genome Consortium for Medicine (ICGCmed) will link the wealth of genomic data already amassed, as well as new genomic data being generated, to clinical and health information, including lifestyle, patient history, cancer diagnostic data, and response to and survival following to therapies, across the cancer spectrum. Using this large-scale integrated data, researchers, scientists, policymakers and clinicians will be able to work with patients, healthcare providers and others to develop preventative strategies, markers for early detection of disease, more specific criteria and methods for diagnoses and prognoses, and interventions based on matching the patient’s disease molecular subtype with the most effective combinations of therapies.

This will lead to the discovery of new therapeutic targets, more precise disease definitions and improved strategies to prevent drug resistance.

== See also ==
- The Cancer Genome Atlas - National Cancer Institute
- Cancer Genome Project - Wellcome Trust Sanger Institute
