= APOBEC3G =

Protein and coding gene in humans

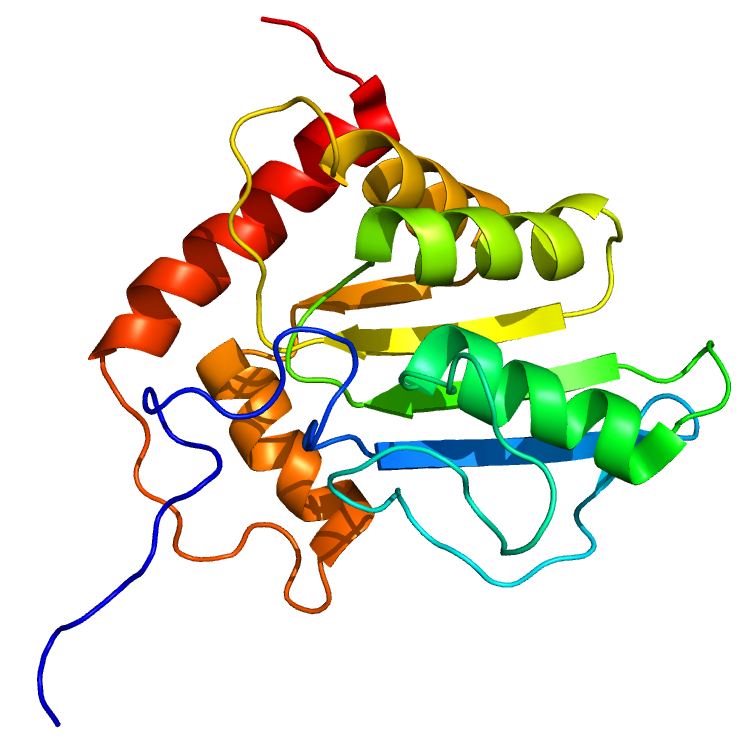

Identifiers
- Aliases: APOBEC3G, A3G, ARCD, ARP-9, ARP9, CEM-15, CEM15, MDS019, bK150C2.7, dJ494G10.1, apolipoprotein B mRNA editing enzyme catalytic subunit 3G
- External IDs: OMIM: 607113; MGI: 1933111; GeneCards: APOBEC3G
Available structures
PDB	Ortholog search: PDBe RCSB
PDB	List of PDB id codes 2JYW, 2KBO, 2KEM, 3E1U, 3IQS, 3IR2, 3V4J, 3V4K, 4ROV, 4ROW
Enzyme activity
EC #	BRENDA	ExPASy	KEGG	MetaCyc
3.5.4.38	↗	↗	↗	↗

Gene location (Mouse)
Chr.	Chromosome 15 (mouse)
Band	15 E1|15 37.85 cM	Start	79,775,860 bp
Band	15 E1|15 37.85 cM	End	79,800,107 bp
Gene ontology
Molecular function	protein homodimerization activity; cytidine deaminase activity; protein binding; catalytic activity; hydrolase activity; hydrolase activity, acting on carbon-nitrogen (but not peptide) bonds, in cyclic amidines; metal ion binding; deoxycytidine deaminase activity; RNA binding; zinc ion binding; dCTP deaminase activity; identical protein binding
Cellular component	nucleus; apolipoprotein B mRNA editing enzyme complex; cytosol; cytoplasm; P-body; ribonucleoprotein complex
Biological process	cytidine deamination; negative regulation of single stranded viral RNA replication via double stranded DNA intermediate; negative regulation of transposition; base conversion or substitution editing; immune system process; DNA cytosine deamination; positive regulation of defense response to virus by host; negative regulation of viral genome replication; negative regulation of viral process; defense response to virus; innate immune response; viral process; cytidine to uridine editing; DNA demethylation
Sources:Amigo / QuickGO
Orthologs
Databases	NCBI: entry; OMA: entry
Species	Human	Mouse
Entrez	60489	80287
Ensembl	ENSG00000239713	ENSMUSG00000009585
UniProt	Q9HC16	Q99J72
RefSeq (mRNA)	NM_021822	NM_001160415; NM_030255; NM_001347041
RefSeq (protein)	NP_068594; NP_001336365; NP_001336366; NP_001336367	NP_001153887; NP_001333970; NP_084531
Location (UCSC)	n/a	Chr 15: 79.78 – 79.8 Mb
PubMed search
- Wikidata
View/Edit Human	View/Edit Mouse

APOBEC3G (apolipoprotein B mRNA editing enzyme, catalytic subunit 3G) is a human enzyme encoded by the APOBEC3G gene that belongs to the APOBEC superfamily of proteins. This family of proteins has been suggested to play an important role in innate anti-viral immunity. APOBEC3G belongs to the family of cytidine deaminases that catalyze the deamination of cytidine to uridine in the single stranded DNA substrate. The C-terminal domain of A3G renders catalytic activity, several NMR and crystal structures explain the substrate specificity and catalytic activity.

APOBEC3G exerts innate antiretroviral immune activity against retroviruses, most notably HIV, by interfering with proper replication. However, lentiviruses such as HIV have evolved the Viral infectivity factor (Vif) protein in order to counteract this effect. Vif interacts with APOBEC3G and triggers the ubiquitination and degradation of APOBEC3G via the proteasomal pathway. On the other hand, foamy viruses produce an accessory protein Bet (P89873) that impairs the cytoplasmic solubility of APOBEC3G. The two ways of inhibition are distinct from each other, but they can replace each other in vivo.

== Discovery ==
It was first identified by Jarmuz et al. as a member of family of proteins APOBEC3A to 3G on chromosome 22 in 2002 and later also as a cellular factor able to restrict replication of HIV-1 lacking the viral accessory protein Vif. Soon after, it was shown that APOBEC3G belonged to a family of proteins grouped together due to their homology with the cytidine deaminase APOBEC1.

== Structure ==
APOBEC3G has a symmetric structure, resulting in 2 homologous catalytic domains, the N-terminal (CD1) and C-terminal (CD2) domains, each of which contains a Zn^{2+} coordination site. Each domain also has the typical His/Cys-X-Glu-X23–28-Pro-Cys-X2-Cys motif for cytidine deaminases. However, unlike the typical cytidine deaminases, APOBEC3G contains a unique alpha helix between two beta sheets in the catalytic domain that could be a cofactor binding site. (Figure 1)

CD2 is catalytically active and vital for deamination and motif specificity. CD1 is catalytically inactive, but very important for binding to DNA and RNA and is key to defining the 5'->3' processivity of APOBEC3G deamination. CD2 has no deaminase activity without the presence of CD1.

Native APOBEC3G is composed of monomers, dimers, trimers, tetramers, and higher order oligomers. While it is thought that APOBEC3G functions as a dimer, it is possible that it actually functions as a mix of monomers and oligomers.

The D128 amino acid residue, which lies within CD1 (Figure 1), appears to be particularly important for APOBEC3G interactions with Vif because a D128K point mutation prevents Vif-dependent depletion of APOBEC3G. Additionally, amino acids 128–130 on APOBEC3G form a negatively charged motif that is critical for interactions with Vif and the formation of APOBEC3G-Vif complexes. Furthermore, residues 124-127 are important for encapsidation of APOBEC3G into HIV-1 virions and the resulting antiretroviral activity.

== Mechanism of action ==
APOBEC3G has been widely studied and several mechanisms that negatively affect HIV-1 replication have been identified.

=== Cytidine deamination and hypermutation ===
APOBEC3G and other proteins in the same family are able to act as activation-induced (cytidine) deaminases (AID). APOBEC3G interferes with reverse transcription by inducing numerous deoxycytidine to deoxyuridine mutations in the negative strand of the HIV DNA primarily expressed as complementary DNA (cDNA) in a 3'->5'processive manner. Because APOBEC3G is part of the APOBEC superfamily and acts as an AID, it is likely that the mechanism mediated by APOBEC3G for cytidine deamination is similar to that of an E. coli cytidine deaminase that is known to be highly homologous to APOBEC1 and AID around the nucleotide and zinc-binding region. The predicted deamination reaction is driven by a direct nucleophilic attack on position 4 of the cytidine pyrimidine ring by the zinc-coordinated enzyme. Water is needed as a source of both a proton and hydroxyl group donor (Figure 2). The deamination (and resulting oxidation) at position 4 yields a carbonyl group and results in a change from cytidine to uridine.

The deamination activity ultimately results in G→A hypermutations at "hot spots" of the proviral DNA. Such hypermutation ultimately destroys the coding and replicative capacity of the virus, resulting in many nonviable virions. APOBEC3G has a much weaker antiviral effect when its active site has been mutated to the point that the protein can no longer mutate retroviral DNA. It was originally thought that the APOBEC3G-mediated deamination can also indirectly lead to viral DNA degradation by DNA repair systems attracted to the mutated residues. However, this has been discounted because human APOBEC3G reduces viral cDNA levels independently of DNA repair enzymes UNG and SMUG1.

=== Interference with reverse transcription ===
APOBEC3G interferes with reverse transcription of HIV-1 independent of DNA deamination. tRNA3Lys typically binds to the HIV-1 primer binding site to initiate reverse transcription. APOBEC3G can inhibit tRNA3Lys priming, thereby negatively affecting viral ssDNA production and virus infectivity. It is predicted that reverse transcription is also negatively affected by APOBEC3G binding to viral RNA and causing steric alterations.

=== Interference with viral DNA integration ===
APOBEC3G was associated with interference of viral DNA integration into the host genome in a manner dependent on functional catalytic domains and deaminase activity. Mbisa et al. saw that APOBEC3G interferes with the processing and removal of primer tRNA from the DNA minus strand, thus leading to aberrant viral 3' long terminal repeat (LTR) DNA ends. These viral DNA ends are inefficient substrates for integration and plus-strand DNA transfer. As a result, HIV-1 provirus formation is inhibited.

== Biological function ==
=== HIV encapsidation ===
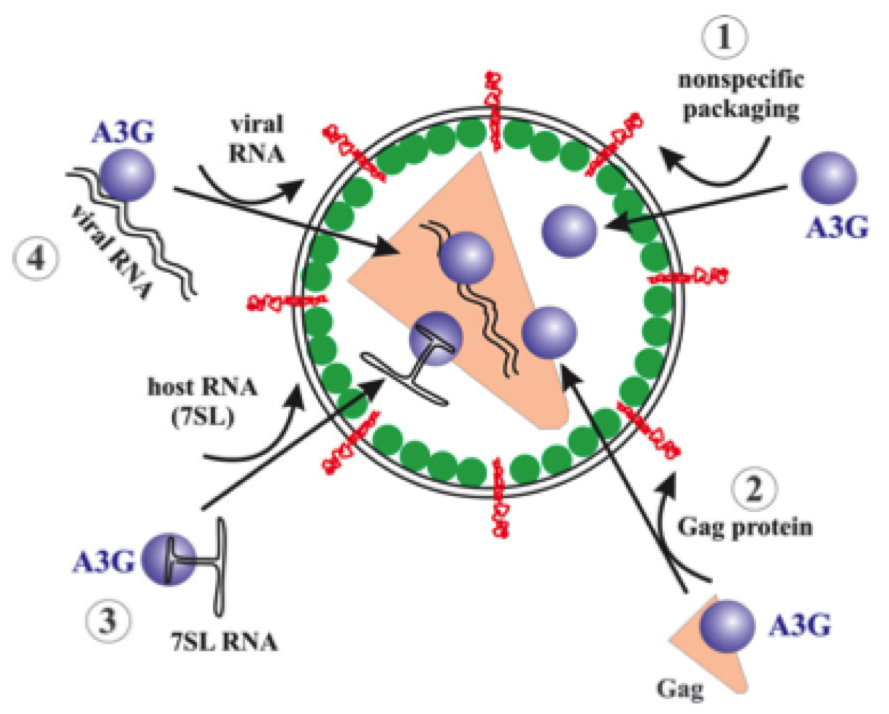
Figure 3: Four proposed mechanisms of APOBEC3G encapsidation in HIV-1 virions. The mechanisms involving interaction with viral RNA and interaction with Gag proteins have been extensively confirmed.

APOBEC3G mRNA is expressed in certain cells, referred to as non-permissive cells, in which HIV-1 cannot properly infect and replicate in the absence of Vif. Such cells include physiologically relevant primary CD4 T lymphocytes and macrophages. The encapsidation of APOBEC3G into HIV-1 virions is very important for the spread of APOBEC3G and the exertion of anti-retroviral activity. Encapsidation of APOBEC3G may occur by at least the following four proposed mechanisms (Figure 3): 1. Non-specific packaging of APOBEC3G 2. APOBEC3G interaction with host RNA 3. APOBEC3G interaction with viral RNA 4. Interaction of APOBEC3G with HIV-1 Gag proteins. Only the latter two mechanisms have been extensively supported.

The amount that is incorporated into virions is dependent on the level of APOBEC3G expression within the cell producing the virion. Xu et al. conducted studies with PBMC cells and found that, in the absence of Vif, 7±4 APOBEC3G molecules were incorporated into the virions and resulted in potent inhibition of HIV-1 replication.

In addition to deterring replication of exogenous retroviruses, A3G also acts upon human endogenous retroviruses, leaving similar signatures of hypermutations in them.

== Disease relevance ==
APOBEC3G is expressed within the non-permissive cells and is a key inhibitory factor of HIV-1 replication and infectivity. However, Vif counteracts this antiretroviral factor, enabling production of viable and infective HIV-1 virions in the presence of APOBEC3G activity . In particular, Vif prevents incorporation of APOBEC3G into HIV-1 virions and promotes destruction of the enzyme in a manner independent of all other HIV-1 proteins.

While APOBEC3G has typically been studied as a vital protein exhibiting potent antiviral effects on HIV-1, recent studies have elucidated the potential of APOBEC3G-mediated mutation to help to facilitate the propagation HIV-1. The number of deaminations in the preferred regions varies from one to many, possibly dependent on the time of exposure to APOBEC3G. Additionally, it has been shown that there is a dose response between intracellular APOBEC3G concentration and degree of viral hypermutation. Some HIV-1 proviruses with APOBEC3G-mediated mutation have been shown to thrive because they carry too few mutations at APOBEC3G hotspots or because recombination between a lethally APOBEC3G-restricted provirus and a viable provirus has occurred. Such sublethal mutagenesis contributes to greater genetic diversity among the HIV-1 virus population, demonstrating the potential for APOBEC3G to enhance HIV-1's ability to adapt and propagate.
