= COSMIC cancer database =

Online biology database

COSMIC

Content
- Description: Catalogue Of Somatic Mutations In Cancer

Contact
- Research center: Wellcome Trust Sanger Institute
- Release date: 4 February 2004

Access
- Website: http://www.sanger.ac.uk/science/tools/cosmic

COSMIC is an online database of somatically acquired mutations found in human cancer. Somatic mutations are those that occur in non-germline cells that are not inherited by children. COSMIC, an acronym of Catalogue Of Somatic Mutations In Cancer, curates data from papers in the scientific literature and large scale experimental screens from the Cancer Genome Project at the Sanger Institute. The database is freely available to academic researchers and commercially licensed to others.

== Creation and history ==
The COSMIC (Catalogue of Somatic Mutations in Cancer) database was designed to collect and display information on somatic mutations in cancer. It was launched in 2004, with data from just four genes, HRAS, KRAS2, NRAS and BRAF. These four genes are known to be somatically mutated in cancer. Since its creation, the database has expanded rapidly. By 2005 COSMIC contained 529 genes screened from 115,327 tumours, describing 20,981 mutations. By August 2009 it contained information from 1.5 million experiments performed, encompassing 13,423 genes in almost 370,000 tumours and describing over 90,000 mutations. COSMIC version 48, released in July 2010, incorporates mutation data from p53 in collaboration with the International Agency for Research on Cancer. In addition, it provided updated gene co-ordinates for the most recent human reference genome builds. This release includes data from over 2.76 million experiments on over half a million tumours. The number of mutations documented in this release totals 141,212.

The website is focused on presenting complex phenotype-specific mutation data in a graphical manner. Data is taken from selected genes, initially in the Cancer Gene Census, as well as literature search from PubMed.

== Process ==
Data can be accessed via selection of a gene or cancer tissue type (phenotype), either using browse by features or the search box. Results show summary information with mutation counts and frequencies. The gene summary page provides a mutation spectrum map and external resources; the phenotype (tissue) summary page provides lists of mutated genes.

=== Examples ===
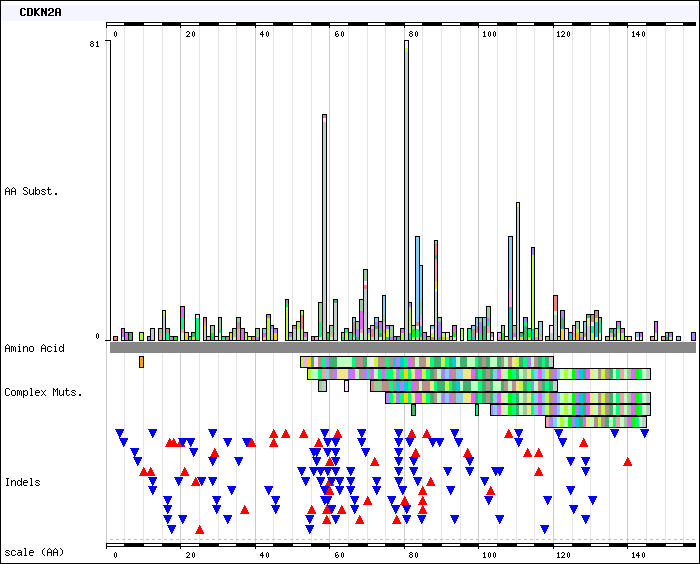
A histogram showing the mutation range for the CDKN2A gene as produced by the COSMIC database.

The figure shows the CDKN2A gene, which is a tumor suppressor that leads to cancer when it is inactivated.

== Contents ==
The COSMIC database contains thousands of somatic mutations that are implicated in the development of cancer. The database collects information from two major sources. Firstly, mutations in known cancer genes are collected from the literature. The list of genes that undergo manual curation are identified by their presence in the Cancer Gene Census. Secondly, data for inclusion in the database is collected from whole genome resequencing studies of cancer samples undertaken by the Cancer Genome Project. For example, Campbell and colleagues used next generation sequencing to examine samples from two individuals with lung cancer which led to the identification of 103 somatic DNA rearrangements. COSMIC also catalogues mutational signatures in human cancer through the COSMIC Signatures group, which represents a collaboration between COSMIC, the Wellcome Sanger Institute, and the University of California, San Diego. The COSMIC signatures database has been leveraged to catalogue the prevalence of specific mutational signatures in human cancer, such as the frequency of ultraviolet radiation-mediated mutagenesis in skin cancers.

== See also ==
- Wellcome Trust Sanger Institute
- Cancer Genome Project
