= Cytidine deaminase =

Protein found in humans

CDA
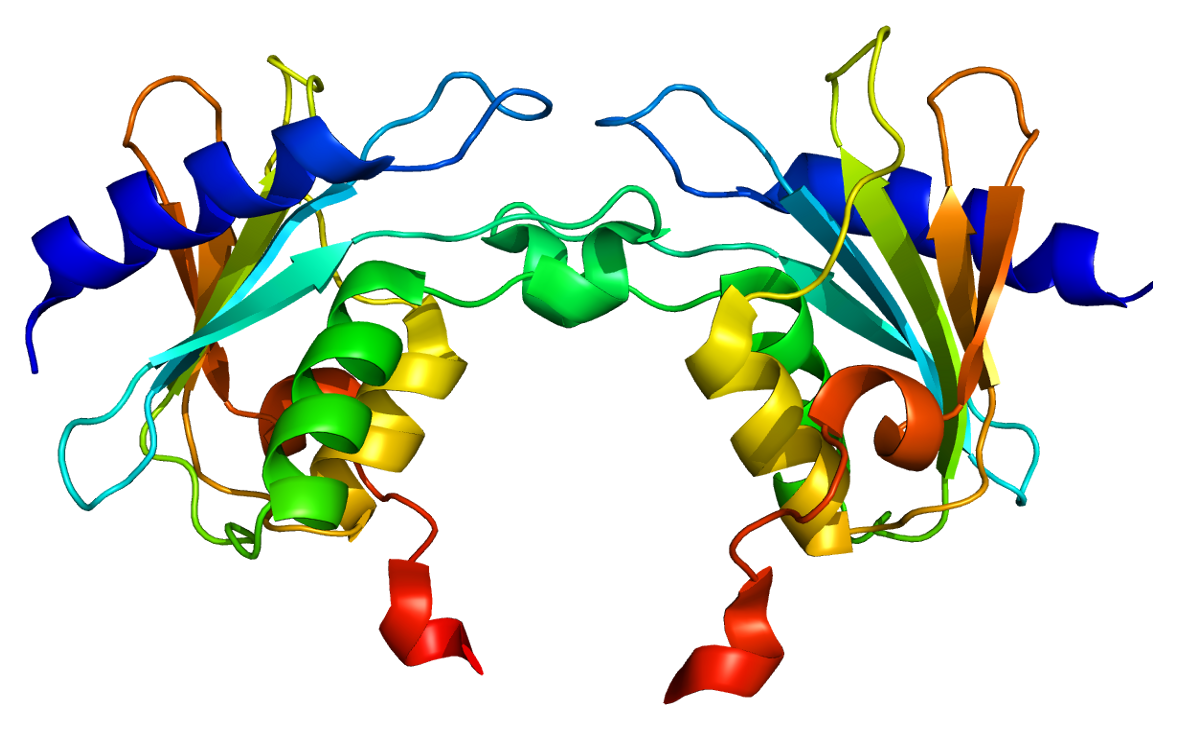

Identifiers
- Aliases: CDA, CDD, cytidine deaminase
- External IDs: OMIM: 123920; MGI: 1919519; GeneCards: CDA
Available structures
PDB	Ortholog search: A0A7K9BC85 PDBe A0A7K9BC85 RCSB
PDB	List of PDB id codes 1MQ0
Enzyme activity
EC #	BRENDA	ExPASy	KEGG	MetaCyc
3.5.4.5	↗	↗	↗	↗

Gene location (Human)
Chr.	Chromosome 1 (human)
Band	1p36.12	Start	20,589,086 bp
Band	1p36.12	End	20,618,903 bp

Gene location (Mouse)
Chr.	Chromosome 4 (mouse)
Band	4|4 D3	Start	138,065,735 bp
Band	4|4 D3	End	138,095,303 bp
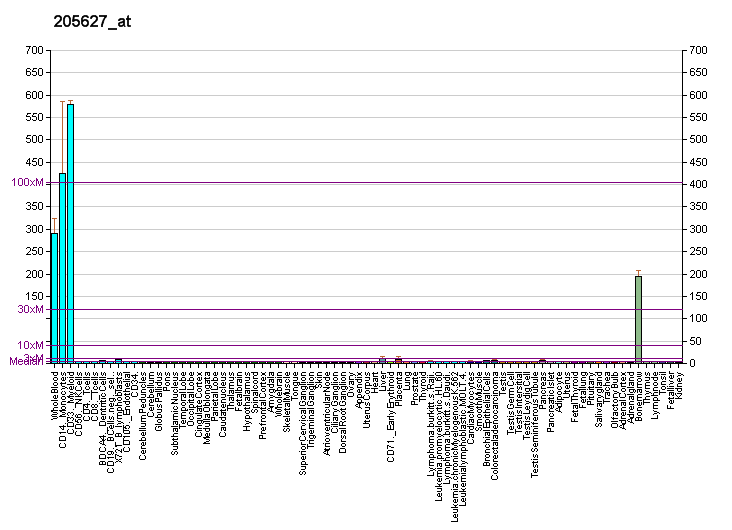
RNA expression pattern
Bgee	Human / Mouse (ortholog); Top expressed in: granulocyte; monocyte; blood; bone marrow; right lobe of liver; trabecular bone; bone marrow cell; testicle; rectum; skin of leg / Top expressed in: right kidney; duodenum; gastrula; human kidney; intestinal villus; jejunum; proximal tubule; lumbar spinal ganglion; facial motor nucleus; endothelial cell of lymphatic vessel; More reference expression data
BioGPS	More reference expression data
Gene ontology
Molecular function	protein homodimerization activity; nucleoside binding; cytidine deaminase activity; zinc ion binding; metal ion binding; protein binding; catalytic activity; identical protein binding; hydrolase activity
Cellular component	cytosol; extracellular region; secretory granule lumen; tertiary granule lumen; ficolin-1-rich granule lumen
Biological process	cytosine metabolic process; pyrimidine nucleoside salvage; cell surface receptor signaling pathway; cytidine deamination; negative regulation of cell growth; pyrimidine-containing compound salvage; negative regulation of nucleotide metabolic process; protein homotetramerization; neutrophil degranulation
Sources:Amigo / QuickGO
Orthologs
Databases	NCBI: entry; OMA: entry
Species	Human	Mouse
Entrez	978	72269
Ensembl	ENSG00000158825	ENSMUSG00000028755
UniProt	P32320	P56389
RefSeq (mRNA)	NM_001785	NM_028176
RefSeq (protein)	NP_001776	NP_082452
Location (UCSC)	Chr 1: 20.59 – 20.62 Mb	Chr 4: 138.07 – 138.1 Mb
PubMed search
- Wikidata
View/Edit Human	View/Edit Mouse

Cytidine deaminase is an enzyme that in humans is encoded by the CDA gene.

This gene encodes an enzyme involved in pyrimidine salvaging. The encoded protein forms a homotetramer that catalyzes the irreversible hydrolytic deamination of the nucleoside, cytidine, to uridine and ammonia:

cytidine
H_{2}O
NH_{3}
uridine

The enzyme also converts deoxycytidine to deoxyuridine. It is one of several deaminases responsible for maintaining the cellular pyrimidine pool. Mutations in this gene are associated with decreased sensitivity to the cytosine nucleoside analogue cytosine arabinoside used in the treatment of certain childhood leukemias. Most cytidine deaminases act on RNA, and the few that act on DNA require ssDNA.

A related activation-induced (cytidine) deaminase (AID) regulates antibody diversification, especially the process of somatic hypermutation.

== Interactive pathway map ==
Click on genes, proteins and metabolites below to link to respective articles. (Note: The interactive pathway map can be edited at WikiPathways: "FluoropyrimidineActivity_WP1601".)

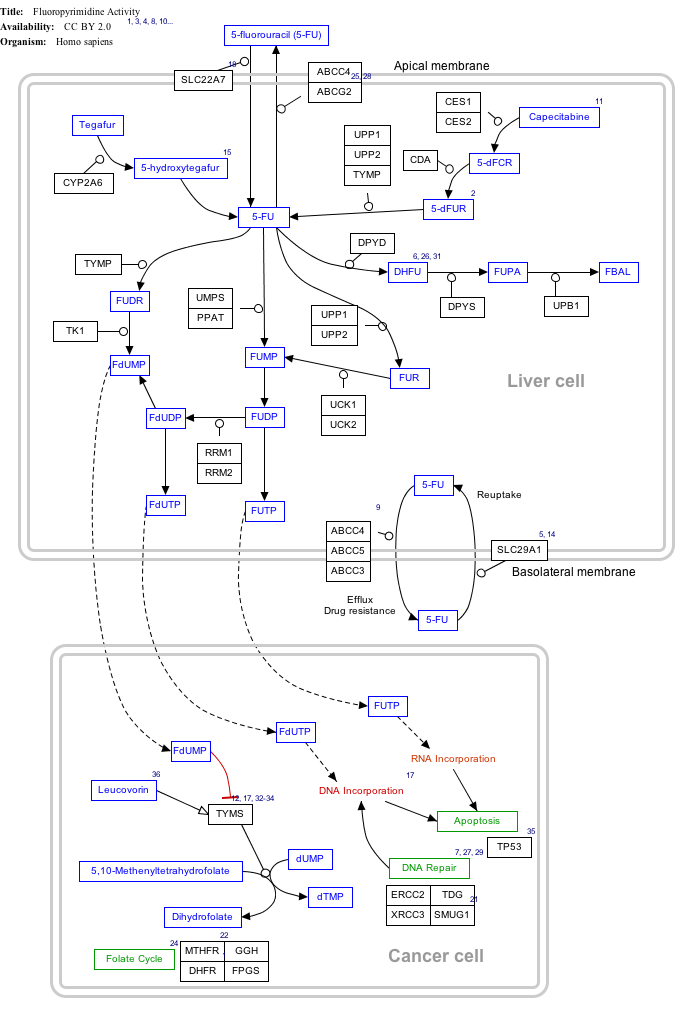

Fluorouracil (5-FU) Activity edit
