= SpliceInfo =

Content
- Description: mRNA alternative splicing in human genome.
- Organisms: Homo sapiens

Contact
- Research center: National Chiao Tung University
- Authors: Hsien-Da Huang
- Primary citation: Huang & al. (2005)

Access
- Website: http://SpliceInfo.mbc.NCTU.edu.tw/

SpliceInfo is a database for the four major alternative-splicing modes (exon skipping, 5'-alternative splicing, 3'-alternative splicing and intron retention) in the human genome.

This resource appears to be no longer available.

== See also ==
- Alternative splicing
- EDAS
- AspicDB
- Hollywood (database)
