= ECgene =

Database of genomic annotations

Content
- Description: genome annotation for alternative splicing.

Contact
- Laboratory: Division of Molecular Life Sciences, Ewha Womans University, Seoul 120-750, Korea.
- Authors: Pora Kim
- Primary citation: Kim & al. (2005)

Access
- Website: http://genome.ewha.ac.kr/ECgene/

ECgene in computational biology is a database of genomic annotations taking alternative splicing events into consideration.

== See also ==
- Alternative splicing
- Alternative Splicing Annotation Project
- AspicDB
- ChimerDB
- TassDB
