= Alternative Splicing and Transcript Diversity database =

2008–2012 European database of transcript variants

ASTD

Content
- Description: Alternative splicing and transcript diversity database

Contact
- Research center: European Bioinformatics Institute
- Authors: Gautier Koscielny
- Primary citation: Koscielny & al. (2009)
- Release date: 2008

Access
- Website: ebi.ac.uk/astd (archive)

The Alternative Splicing and Transcript Diversity database (ASTD) was a database of transcript variants maintained by the European Bioinformatics Institute from 2008 to 2012. It contained transcription initiation, polyadenylation and splicing variant data.

== See also ==
- Alternative Splicing Annotation Project
- AspicDB
- RNA splicing
