= Intronerator =

Gene expression

Content
- Description: introns and alternative splicing in Caenorhabditis elegans.
- Organisms: Caenorhabditis elegans

Contact
- Research center: University of California
- Laboratory: Center for Molecular Biology of RNA
- Authors: Jim Kent
- Primary citation: Kent & al. (2000)

Access
- Website: http://genome.ucsc.edu/cgi-bin/hgTracks?clade=worm&organism=C._elegans

The Intronerator is a database of alternatively spliced genes and a database of introns for Caenorhabditis elegans.

== See also ==
- Alternative splicing
- AspicDB
- EDAS
- Hollywood (database)
- List of biological databases
