= PDBe-KB =

Medical database

Protein Data Bank in Europe Knowledge Base
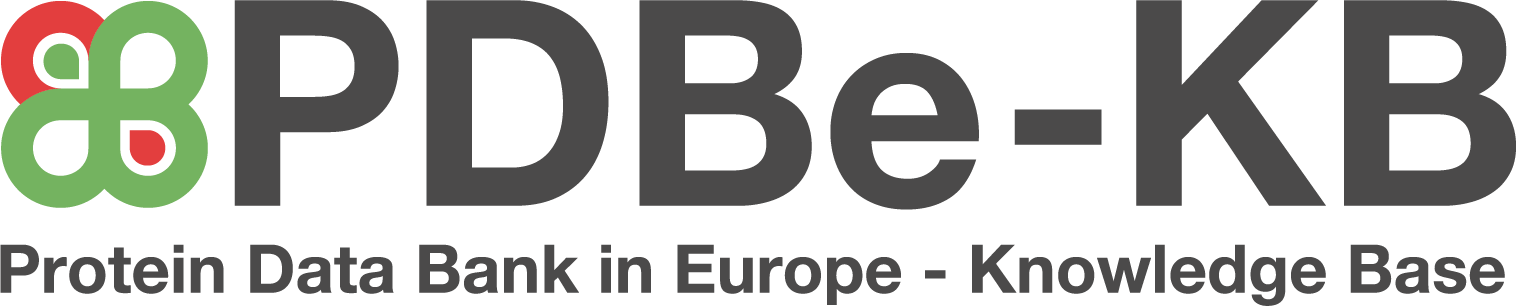

Content
- Description: Protein structure; Protein Data Bank; Functional annotation

Contact
- Research center: European Bioinformatics Institute
- Primary citation: PMID 31584092

Access
- Website: www.pdbe-kb.org

Protein Data Bank in Europe – Knowledge Base (PDBe-KB) is a community-driven, open-access, integrated resource whose mission is to place macromolecular structure data in their biological context and to make them accessible to the scientific community in order to support fundamental and translational research and education. It is part of the European Bioinformatics Institute (EMBL-EBI), based at the Wellcome Genome Campus, Hinxton, Cambridgeshire, England.
