= ChEMBL =

Chemical database of bioactive molecules also having drug-like properties

Content
- Description: Biological database
- Data types captured: Molecules with drug-like properties and biological activity

Contact
- Research center: European Molecular Biology Laboratory
- Laboratory: (United Kingdom) European Bioinformatics Institute
- Authors: Noel O'Boyle, Team Leader 2025-Present; Andrew Leach, Team Leader 2016-2025; John Overington, Team Leader 2008-2015
- Primary citation: PMID 21948594
- Release date: 2009

Access
- Website: ChEMBL
- Download URL: Downloads
- Web service URL: ChEMBL Webservices
- Sparql endpoint: ChEMBL EBI-RDF Platform

Miscellaneous
- License: The ChEMBL data is made available on a Creative Commons Attribution-ShareAlike 3.0 Unported Licence
- Versioning: ChEMBL_37

ChEMBL or ChEMBLdb is a manually curated chemical database of bioactive molecules with drug inducing properties. It is maintained by the European Bioinformatics Institute (EBI), of the European Molecular Biology Laboratory (EMBL), based at the Wellcome Trust Genome Campus, Hinxton, UK.

The database, originally known as StARlite, was developed by a biotechnology company called Inpharmatica Ltd. later acquired by Galapagos NV. The data was acquired for EMBL in 2008 with an award from The Wellcome Trust, resulting in the creation of the Chemogenomics group at EMBL-EBI, led by John Overington. This group is now known as the Chemical Biology Resources team.

== Scope and access ==
The ChEMBL database contains compound bioactivity data against drug targets. Bioactivity is reported in Ki, Kd, IC50, and EC50. Data can be filtered and analyzed to develop compound screening libraries for lead identification during drug discovery.

ChEMBL version 2 (ChEMBL_02) was launched in January 2010, including 2.4 million bioassay measurements covering 622,824 compounds, including 24,000 natural products. This was obtained from curating over 34,000 publications across twelve medicinal chemistry journals. ChEMBL's coverage of available bioactivity data has grown to become "the most comprehensive ever seen in a public database.". In October 2010 ChEMBL version 8 (ChEMBL_08) was launched, with over 2.97 million bioassay measurements covering 636,269 compounds.

ChEMBL_10 saw the addition of the PubChem confirmatory assays, in order to integrate data that is comparable to the type and class of data contained within ChEMBL.

ChEMBLdb can be accessed via a web interface or downloaded by File Transfer Protocol. It is formatted in a manner amenable to computerized data mining, and attempts to standardize activities between different publications, to enable comparative analysis. ChEMBL is also integrated into other large-scale chemistry resources, including PubChem and the ChemSpider system of the Royal Society of Chemistry.

== Associated resources ==
In addition to the database, the ChEMBL group have developed tools and resources for data mining. These include Kinase SARfari, an integrated chemogenomics workbench focussed on kinases. The system incorporates and links sequence, structure, compounds and screening data.

GPCR SARfari is a similar workbench focused on GPCRs, and ChEMBL-Neglected Tropical Diseases (ChEMBL-NTD) is a repository for Open Access primary screening and medicinal chemistry data directed at endemic tropical diseases of the developing regions of the Africa, Asia, and the Americas. The primary purpose of ChEMBL-NTD is to provide a freely accessible and permanent archive and distribution centre for deposited data.

July 2012 saw the release of a new malaria data service, sponsored by the Medicines for Malaria Venture (MMV), aimed at researchers around the globe. The data in this service includes compounds from the Malaria Box screening set, as well as the other donated malaria data found in ChEMBL-NTD.

myChEMBL, the ChEMBL virtual machine, was released in October 2013 to allow users to access a complete and free, easy-to-install cheminformatics infrastructure.

In December 2013, the operations of the SureChem patent informatics database were transferred to EMBL-EBI. In a portmanteau, SureChem was renamed SureChEMBL.

2014 saw the introduction of the new resource ADME SARfari - a tool for predicting and comparing cross-species ADME targets.

== See also ==
- ChEMBL: Quick Tour on EBI Train OnLine
- ChEBI
- DrugBank
