= Conjoined gene =

A conjoined gene (CG) is defined as a gene, which gives rise to transcripts by combining at least part of one exon from each of two or more distinct known (parent) genes that lie on the same chromosome, are in the same orientation, and often translate independently into different proteins. In some cases, the transcripts formed by CGs are translated to form chimeric or completely novel proteins.

A conjoined gene arises from the fusion of exons from two distinct genes in the same chromosomal orientation. While some CGs translate independently into distinct proteins, others produce chimeric or novel proteins, supporting that 95% of CGs function independently with a subset, forming unique protein products. One study identifies 17 CGs in lymphoma cells, with some being recurrently expressed and potentially playing a role in disease progression. These highlight the chimeric transcripts involving non-coding RNAs, suggesting that CGs can contribute to novel gene regulatory mechanisms.

Cartoonic representation of the formation of conjoined gene A-B from parent genes A and B.

Several alternative names are used to address conjoined genes, including combined gene and complex gene, fusion gene, fusion protein, read-through transcript, co-transcribed genes, bridged genes, spanning genes, hybrid genes, and locus-spanning transcripts.

While the mechanism regarding conjoined gene transcription is relatively unknown, one study investigated Cdc2-like kinase (CLK) activity to determine its effects on the formation of conjoined gene transcript formation. This study revealed inhibition of CLK activity contributes to triiodothyronine (T3)-dose-dependent mechanisms, which are associated with motif enrichment and affect alternative splicing events.

Changes occurring in alternative splicing events then result in skipped exons, intron retention, and delaying of introns. As a result due to variations in alternative splicing events, the potential splice combinations of exons varies as well, which facilitates the formation of CG transcripts. Additionally, CLK inhibition is associated with motif enrichment of select exons, which promotes increased exon skipping, resulting in a further increase in conjoined gene transcription.

Scientists have been able to narrow down some possibilities regarding the origin and general purpose of conjoined genes. They could play a role in gene regulation since they can prevent the expression of more than one parent gene. Conjoined genes are also seen in different animal species, indicating they are conserved and have endured purifying evolutionary selective pressures. This conservation suggests they are essential for various functional roles.

At present, 800 CGs have been identified in the entire human genome by different research groups across the world including Prakash et al., Akiva et al., Parra et al., Kim et al., and in the 1% of the human genome in the ENCODE pilot project. 36% of all these CGs could be validated experimentally using RT-PCR and sequencing techniques. However, only a very limited number of these CGs are found in the public human genome resources such as the Entrez Gene database, the UCSC Genome Browser and the Vertebrate Genome Annotation (Vega) database.

More than 70% of the human conjoined genes are found to be conserved across other vertebrate genomes with higher order vertebrates showing more conservation, including the closest human ancestor, chimpanzees. Formation of CGs is not only limited to the human genome but some CGs have also been identified in other eukaryotic genomes, including mice and drosophila. There are a few web resources which include information about some CGs in addition to the other fusion genes, for example, ChimerDB and HYBRIDdb. Another database, ConjoinG, is a comprehensive resource dedicated only to the 800 Conjoined Genes identified in the entire human genome.

Since CGs are conserved in animals, vertebrate genomes, and both normal and cancer cells, it is difficult to determine their role in cancer. However, there is a group of 14 CGs, mainly consisting of non-coding RNAs, that are exclusively expressed in acute lymphoblastic leukemia (ALL) cases, the most frequent form of childhood cancer. This subset of CGs is not present in solid cancers or normal cells, which indicates their potential as leukemia-specific biomarkers.

Studies have identified a subset of CGs with oncogenic potential in non-Hodgkin B-cell lymphoma (B-NHL). 17 CGs were detected, with some being exclusive to lymphoma and others present in normal cells. The recurrent, in-frame fusion gene was found only in B-NHL cases, suggesting its potential role in lymphoma progression. This supports the idea that specific CGs could serve as genetic biomarkers for cancer subtypes.

== See also ==
- Gene expression
