= Hollywood (database) =

HOLLYWOOD

Content
- Description: Comparative relational database of alternative splicing.

Contact
- Research center: Massachusetts Institute of Technology
- Authors: Dirk Holste
- Primary citation: Holste & al. (2006)

Access
- Website: http://hollywood.mit.edu

Hollywood is a RNA splicing database containing data for the splicing of orthologous genes in different species.

== See also ==
- Alternative splicing
- EDAS
- AspicDB
