= Jacques Dubochet =

Swiss biophysicist

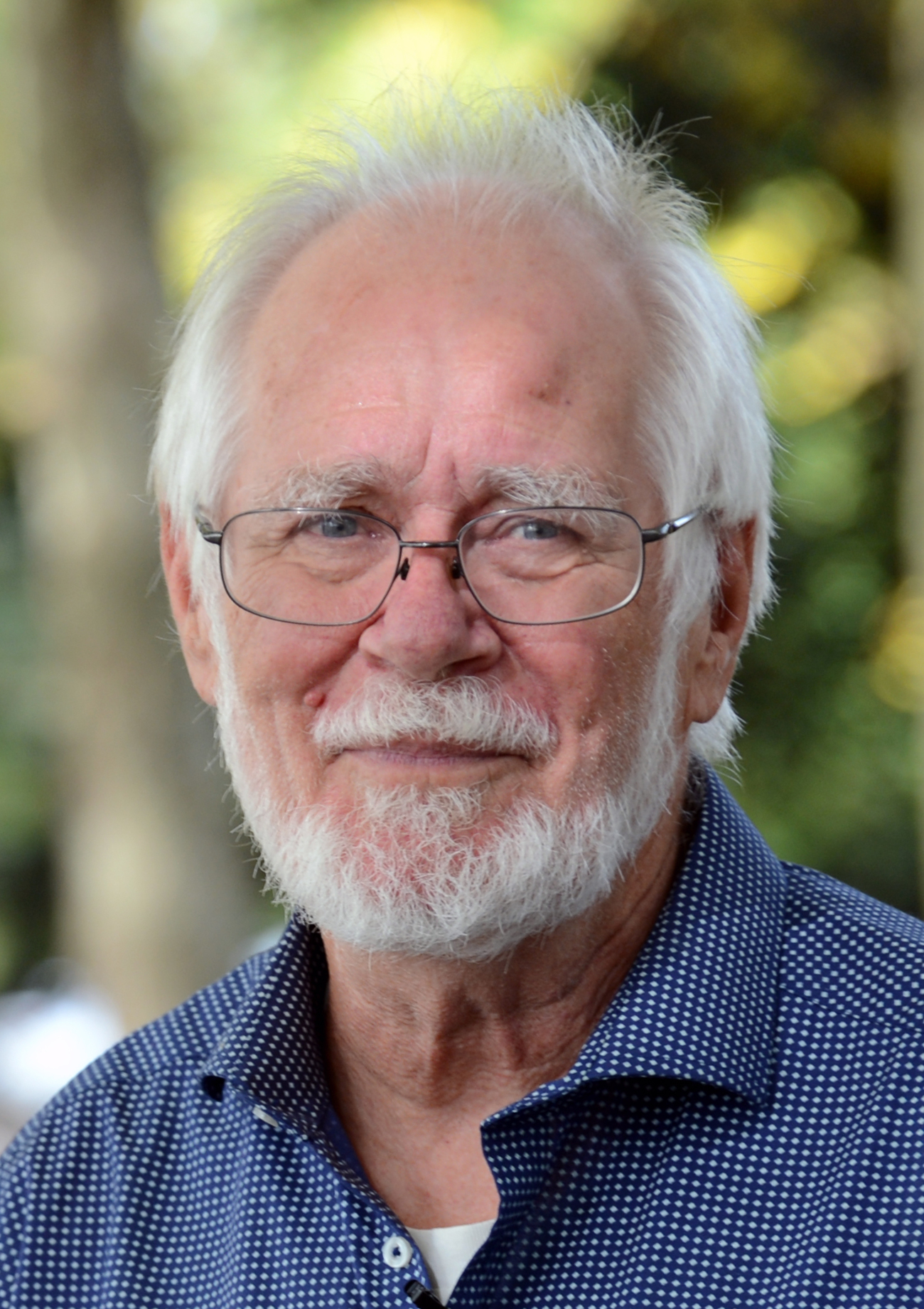
- Dubochet in 2017
- Born: 8 June 1942 (age 83); Aigle, Switzerland
- Citizenship: Switzerland
- Education: École polytechnique fédérale de Lausanne (BS); University of Geneva (MS); University of Geneva (PhD) University of Basel (PhD)
- Known for: Cryo-electron microscopy
- Awards: Nobel Prize in Chemistry (2017)
- Scientific career
- Fields: Structural biology Cryo-electron microscopy
- Institutions: European Molecular Biology Laboratory (1978–1987); University of Lausanne (since 1987)
- Thesis: Contribution to the use of dark-field electron microscopy in biology (1974)
- Doctoral advisor: Eduard Kellenberger

Jacques Dubochet (born 8 June 1942) is a retired Swiss biophysicist. He is a former researcher at the European Molecular Biology Laboratory in Heidelberg, Germany, and an honorary professor of biophysics at the University of Lausanne in Switzerland.

In 2017, he received the Nobel Prize in Chemistry together with Joachim Frank and Richard Henderson "for developing cryo-electron microscopy for the high-resolution structure determination of biomolecules in solution". He received the Royal Photographic Society Progress Medal, alongside his colleagues Professor Joachim Frank and Dr Richard Henderson, in 2018 for 'an important advance in the scientific or technological development of photography or imaging in the widest sense'.

== Career ==
Dubochet started to study physics at the École polytechnique de l'Université de Lausanne (now École polytechnique fédérale de Lausanne) in 1962 and obtained his degree in physical engineering in 1967. He obtained a Certificate of Molecular Biology at University of Geneva in 1969 and then began to study electron microscopy of DNA. In 1973, he completed his thesis in biophysics at University of Geneva and University of Basel.

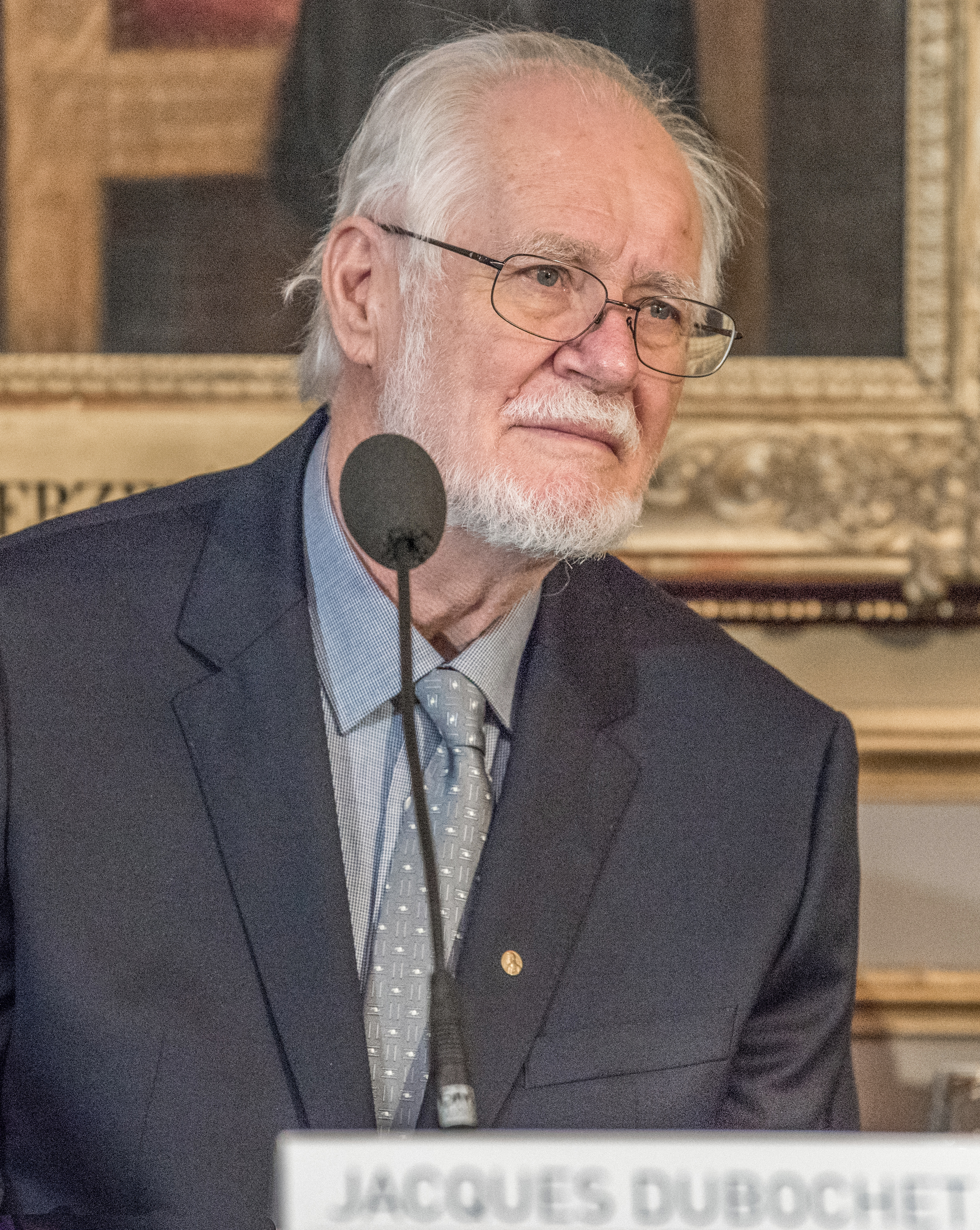
Dubochet at the Nobel Prize press conference in Stockholm (December 2017)

From 1978 to 1987, Dubochet was group leader at the European Molecular Biology Laboratory in Heidelberg, then part of West Germany. From 1987 to 2007, he was professor at the University of Lausanne. In 2007, at 65 years old, he retired and became an honorary professor at the University of Lausanne.

During his career, Dubochet developed technologies in cryo-electron microscopy, cryo-electron tomography and cryo-electron microscopy of vitreous sections. These technologies are used to image individual biological structures such as protein complexes or virus particles. At Lausanne he took part in initiatives to make scientists more aware of social issues.

In 2014, Dubochet received EMBL's Lennart Philipson Award. Describing his career in 2015, Professor Gareth Griffiths, his colleague at EMBL explained: "Jacques had a vision. He found a way of freezing thin films of water so fast that crystals had no time to form [that could damage samples] [...] over time the technique has become increasingly important to life science research, and it is clear today it is Nobel Prize-worthy."

When asked by his university how he would like his Nobel Prize to be recognised by the institution he asked for a parking space for his bicycle which was duly given. He had cycled to his lab almost every day for 30 years.

At the end of November 2021, the Dubochet Center for Imaging (DCI), which bears his name, was launched by the Swiss Federal Institute of Technology in Lausanne, the University of Lausanne and the University of Geneva. Just a few weeks later, the DCI was able to make a significant contribution to deciphering the Omicron variant of the COVID-19 virus.

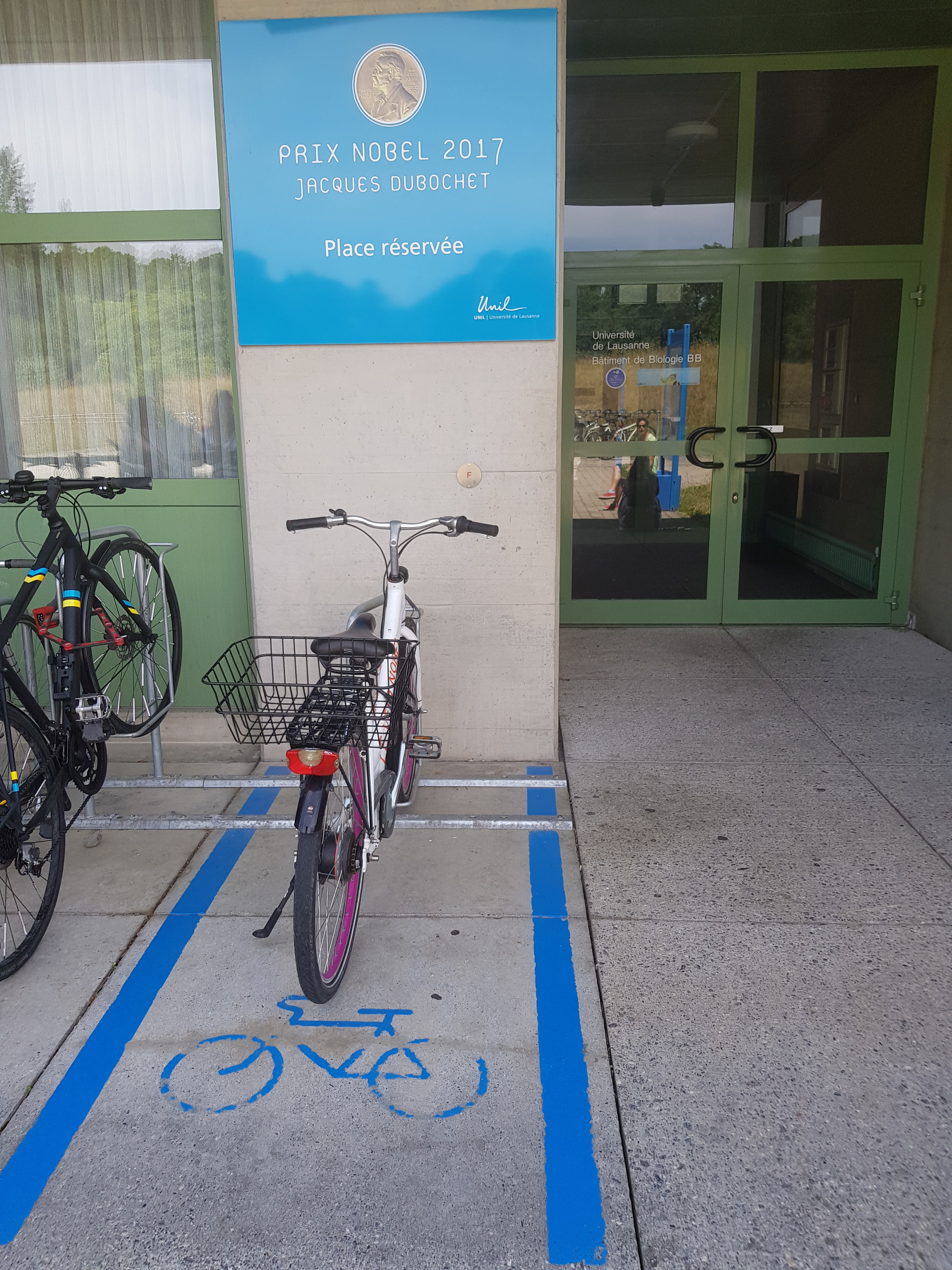
Parking Place Reserved for Jacques Dubochet on the University of Lausanne Campus

== Personal life ==
Dubochet is married with two children. He has dyslexia.

In the 1970s, for the second meeting with his future wife, they went to protest against the Kaiseraugst nuclear power plant construction project.

Dubochet is a member of the Social Democratic Party of Switzerland, and a member of the municipal parliament of Morges, where he holds a seat on the supervisory committee. He is also part of the climate movement as a member of the Grandparents for Future and emphasized the urgency of saving our societies.

== Bibliography ==
- (in French) Jacques Dubochet, Parcours, Éditions Rosso, 2018, 216 pages (ISBN 9782940560097).
