= European Research Infrastructure Consortium =

EU legal form for jointly operated research infrastructures

A European Research Infrastructure Consortium (ERIC) is a legal form under European Union law that allows several countries to jointly establish and operate a research infrastructure of European interest. An ERIC is set up by a decision of the European Commission and, from the date that decision takes effect, has legal personality and the most extensive legal capacity accorded to legal entities under the law of each of its member countries.

The membership of an ERIC must include at least one EU member state and two further countries that are either member states or countries associated to the EU research framework programme. Its statutory seat must be located on the territory of a member that is a member state or an associated country, and its name must include the initialism ERIC.

An ERIC operates principally on a non-economic basis, although it may carry out limited economic activities closely related to its principal task. It is recognised by its host country as an international body for the purposes of exemption from value-added tax and excise duty, and may adopt its own procurement rules.

The legal form was created by Council Regulation (EC) No 723/2009, which entered into force on 28 August 2009, and was amended in 2013 to allow associated countries to participate on the same footing as member states. The first ERIC, SHARE-ERIC, was established in March 2011. As of August 2026, the European Commission lists 32 ERICs.

== Legal basis ==
The ERIC framework was established by Council Regulation (EC) No 723/2009 of 25 June 2009 on the Community legal framework for a European Research Infrastructure Consortium, adopted on the basis of Articles 187 and 188 of the Treaty on the Functioning of the European Union. The Regulation was published in the Official Journal of the European Union on 8 August 2009 and entered into force twenty days later, on 28 August 2009.

As originally adopted, the Regulation required an ERIC to have at least three EU member states as members, and required member states to hold jointly the majority of the voting rights in the assembly of members. Because the contributions of associated countries could therefore not be fully reflected in membership or voting rights, and because no associated country or other third state had by then joined any ERIC, the Commission proposed an amendment in 2012.

Council Regulation (EU) No 1261/2013 of 2 December 2013 replaced Article 9(2) and (3) accordingly. Membership must now include one member state and two other countries that are either member states or associated countries, and member states or associated countries jointly hold the voting majority. The amendment also provided that, for an ERIC hosted by a member state, proposals to amend the statutes require the agreement of a majority of the member states that are members of that ERIC.

Unlike the joint undertakings established for joint technology initiatives, of which the European Union is systematically a member, the Union is not necessarily a member of an ERIC.

== Establishment ==
Setting up an ERIC involves two stages. In the first, the prospective members submit an application to the Commission, which assesses it with the assistance of independent experts against the requirements laid down in the Regulation. In the second stage, all applicants sign a formal request to the Commission to set up the ERIC. The Commission then seeks the opinion of the committee for the implementation of the ERIC Regulation and adopts an implementing decision, which is provided to the applicants and published in the Official Journal together with the essential elements of the statutes.

An application must contain a request to set up the ERIC; the proposed statutes; a technical and scientific description of the infrastructure; and a declaration by the host country recognising the ERIC as an international body within the meaning of the value-added tax and excise duty directives. The statutes must set out at least the list of members, the statutory seat, the name, the rights and obligations of members, the bodies of the ERIC and their responsibilities and decision-making procedures, the duration, the basic principles, the working language, and references to the rules implementing the statutes.

To qualify, the proposed infrastructure must be necessary for carrying out European research activities; represent a significant improvement in the relevant scientific and technological fields at European and international level; grant effective access to the European research community; contribute to the mobility of researchers and to knowledge-sharing within the European Research Area; and contribute to disseminating and optimising the results of research, technological development and demonstration activities.

The Commission publishes practical guidelines to assist applicants and existing ERICs. They were first issued in 2010, following the adoption of the Regulation, and updated in 2015 to reflect the 2013 amendment. A further revision was published on 10 April 2025, restructuring the guidelines to align more closely with the Regulation, reflecting technological and legal developments over the preceding decade, adding guidance on matters beyond the scope of the Regulation, and updating the annexes to include reporting best practice.

== Legal status and privileges ==
An ERIC acquires legal personality on the date the Commission decision setting it up takes effect. In each member country it has the most extensive legal capacity accorded to legal entities under national law, and may in particular acquire, own and dispose of movable, immovable and intellectual property, conclude contracts and be a party to legal proceedings.

=== Taxation ===
An ERIC is recognised by its host country as an international body or organisation within the meaning of Council Directive 2006/112/EC on value added tax and Council Directive (EU) 2020/262 on excise duty. Subject to limits and conditions, it may therefore benefit from exemption from those taxes and duties on its purchases in all member states.

=== Procurement ===
An ERIC qualifies as an international organisation for the purposes of EU public procurement rules and may adopt its own procurement procedures, which must respect the principles of transparency, non-discrimination and competition.

=== Liability ===
Under Article 14 of the Regulation, an ERIC is liable for its own debts. The financial liability of its members is limited to their respective contributions, although members may specify in the statutes that they assume a fixed liability above their contributions, or unlimited liability. Where members' liability is not unlimited, the ERIC must take out insurance covering the risks specific to the construction and operation of the infrastructure. The European Union is not liable for the debts of an ERIC.

== Membership and governance ==
Four categories of entity may become members of an ERIC: EU member states; associated countries; third countries other than associated countries; and intergovernmental organisations. Member states and associated countries may join at any time on fair and reasonable terms set out in the statutes, or take part as observers without voting rights. Third countries other than associated countries and intergovernmental organisations may also become members, subject to approval by the assembly of members and to the conditions and procedure laid down in the statutes.

Member states or associated countries must jointly hold the majority of the voting rights in the assembly of members. The assembly of members is the body with full decision-making powers; the internal structure of an ERIC is otherwise flexible and is defined by its members in the statutes. Any member may be represented by one or more public entities, including regions, or by private entities with a public service mission.

== Supervision ==
The Commission monitors compliance with the Regulation. Where it obtains indications that an ERIC is acting in serious breach of the Regulation, of decisions adopted under it, or of other applicable law, it may request explanations from the ERIC or its members and propose remedial action. If no remedial action is taken, the Commission may repeal the decision establishing the ERIC.

The Commission reports periodically on the application of the Regulation. The first report, covering the period to May 2014, recorded seven ERICs and judged the take-up of the framework successful. The second report, presented on 6 July 2018, recorded a further twelve. The third report was adopted on 14 August 2023. It found that the ERIC had become the legal instrument of choice for a large part of Europe's common research infrastructure initiatives, particularly those prioritised on the European Strategy Forum on Research Infrastructures (ESFRI) roadmap, while identifying financial and operational sustainability as a continuing challenge. It recommended strengthening ERIC access programmes and service availability, increasing synergies between funding sources, facilitating engagement with international partners, and addressing a range of operational issues.

== ERIC Forum ==
The ERIC Forum is a network of the existing ERICs. It grew out of an informal ERIC network convened by the Commission, and was established by a memorandum of understanding agreed at the sixth ERIC network meeting, held in Helsinki on 9 and 10 May 2017 and signed by thirteen ERICs. The memorandum is not legally binding. Its stated objectives are to identify common challenges and develop joint responses, to contribute to the further development of the ERIC Regulation, and to strengthen the visibility, impact and sustainability of ERICs.

Recurring topics for the Forum have included procurement rules, harmonised reporting, the practical implementation of value-added tax and excise exemptions, human resources policy, in-kind contributions and the training of governance body representatives. In 2018 the ERIC Forum Implementation Project received funding under Horizon 2020.

== Policy context ==
The Commission announced in the Competitiveness Compass that it would adopt a European Research Area Act in 2026, with the strengthening of European research infrastructures among its stated aims. A public consultation ran from 13 October 2025 to 23 January 2026 and drew 735 contributions and 117 position papers, with responses from all 27 EU member states, eight countries associated to Horizon Europe and 15 non-EU countries. Academic and research institutions accounted for the largest share of respondents. The Commission proposal is expected in the third quarter of 2026. The ERIC Forum submitted a contribution to the consultation. ESFRI's position paper on the Act called, among other things, for targeted improvements to the ERIC legal framework and for greater consolidation of the European research infrastructure landscape.

== List of ERICs ==
As of August 2026, the European Commission lists the following 32 ERICs. Statutory seats are as stated in the statutes annexed to or published alongside each establishing decision, except where a separate source is cited. Dates are those of the Commission decision setting the consortium up.

Name	Full name	Statutory seat	Established	Commission decision	Website
SHARE-ERIC	Survey of Health, Ageing and Retirement in Europe	Munich, Germany	17 March 2011	2011/166/EU	share-eric.eu
CLARIN ERIC	Common Language Resources and Technology Infrastructure	Utrecht, Netherlands	29 February 2012	2012/136/EU	www.clarin.eu
EATRIS-ERIC	European Advanced Translational Research Infrastructure in Medicine	Amsterdam, Netherlands	7 November 2013	2013/640/EU	eatris.eu
ESS ERIC	European Social Survey	London, United Kingdom	22 November 2013	2013/700/EU	www.europeansocialsurvey.org
BBMRI-ERIC	Biobanks and Biomolecular Resources Research Infrastructure	Graz, Austria	22 November 2013	2013/701/EU	www.bbmri-eric.eu
ECRIN-ERIC	European Clinical Research Infrastructure Network	Paris, France	29 November 2013	2013/713/EU	www.ecrin.org
Euro-Argo ERIC	European contribution to the Argo programme	Plouzané, France	5 May 2014	2014/261/EU	www.euro-argo.eu
CERIC-ERIC	Central European Research Infrastructure Consortium	Trieste, Italy	24 June 2014	2014/392/EU	www.ceric-eric.eu
DARIAH ERIC	Digital Research Infrastructure for the Arts and Humanities	Paris, France	6 August 2014	2014/526/EU	www.dariah.eu
JIV-ERIC	Joint Institute for Very Long Baseline Interferometry	Dwingeloo, Netherlands	12 December 2014	2014/923/EU	www.jive.eu
European Spallation Source ERIC	European Spallation Source	Lund, Sweden	19 August 2015	(EU) 2015/1478	europeanspallationsource.se
ICOS ERIC	Integrated Carbon Observation System	Helsinki, Finland	26 October 2015	(EU) 2015/2097	www.icos-ri.eu
EMSO ERIC	European Multidisciplinary Seafloor and Water Column Observatory	Rome, Italy	29 September 2016	(EU) 2016/1757	emso.eu
LifeWatch ERIC	e-Science and Technology European Infrastructure for Biodiversity and Ecosystem Research	Seville, Spain	17 March 2017	(EU) 2017/499	www.lifewatch.eu
CESSDA ERIC	Consortium of European Social Science Data Archives	Bergen, Norway	9 June 2017	(EU) 2017/995	www.cessda.eu
ECCSEL ERIC	European Carbon Dioxide Capture and Storage Laboratory Infrastructure	Trondheim, Norway	9 June 2017	(EU) 2017/996	www.eccsel.org
Instruct-ERIC	Integrated Structural Biology	Oxford, United Kingdom	4 July 2017	(EU) 2017/1213	instruct-eric.org
EMBRC-ERIC	European Marine Biological Resource Centre	Paris, France	20 February 2018	(EU) 2018/272	www.embrc.eu
EU-OPENSCREEN ERIC	European Infrastructure of Open Screening Platforms for Chemical Biology	Berlin, Germany	20 March 2018	(EU) 2018/499	www.eu-openscreen.eu
EPOS ERIC	European Plate Observing System	Rome, Italy	30 October 2018	(EU) 2018/1732	www.epos-eu.org
Euro-BioImaging ERIC	European Research Infrastructure for Imaging Technologies in Biological and Biomedical Sciences	Turku, Finland	29 October 2019	(EU) 2019/1854	www.eurobioimaging.eu
ELI ERIC	Extreme Light Infrastructure	Dolní Břežany, Czech Republic	30 April 2021	(EU) 2021/960	eli-laser.eu
AnaEE-ERIC	Analysis and Experimentation on Ecosystems	Gif-sur-Yvette, France	22 February 2022	(EU) 2022/289	www.anaee.eu
MIRRI-ERIC	Microbial Resource Research Infrastructure	Braga, Portugal	16 June 2022	(EU) 2022/1204	www.mirri-eric.eu
EU-SOLARIS ERIC	European Solar Research Infrastructure for Concentrated Solar Power	Almería, Spain	19 October 2022	(EU) 2022/2297	eu-solaris.eu
ACTRIS ERIC	Aerosol, Clouds and Trace Gases Research Infrastructure	Helsinki, Finland	25 April 2023	(EU) 2023/900	www.actris.eu
INFRAFRONTIER ERIC	European Research Infrastructure for Modelling Human Diseases	Munich, Germany	20 December 2023	(EU) 2023/2865	infrafrontier.eu
LOFAR ERIC	Low Frequency Array	Dwingeloo, Netherlands	20 December 2023	(EU) 2023/2881	www.lofar.eu
CTAO ERIC	Cherenkov Telescope Array Observatory	Bologna, Italy	7 January 2025	(EU) 2025/7	www.ctao.org
EHRI-ERIC	European Holocaust Research Infrastructure	Amsterdam, Netherlands	20 January 2025	(EU) 2025/194	www.ehri-project.eu
E-RIHS ERIC	European Research Infrastructure for Heritage Science	Florence, Italy	28 March 2025	(EU) 2025/709	www.e-rihs.eu
DANUBIUS-ERIC	International Centre for Advanced Studies on River–Sea Systems	Murighiol, Romania	25 June 2025	(EU) 2025/1238	danubius-ri.eu

== See also ==
- European Research Area
- European Strategy Forum on Research Infrastructures
- Framework Programmes for Research and Technological Development
