= Eurocarbdb =

EuroCarbDB was an EU-funded initiative for the creation of software and standards for the systematic collection of carbohydrate structures and their experimental data, which was discontinued in 2010 due to lack of funding. The project included a database of known carbohydrate structures and experimental data, specifically mass spectrometry, HPLC and NMR data, accessed via a web interface that provides for browsing, searching and contribution of structures and data to the database. The project also produces a number of associated bioinformatics tools for carbohydrate researchers:

- GlycanBuilder, a Java applet for drawing glycan structures
- GlycoWorkbench, a standalone Java application for semi-automated analysis and annotation of glycan mass spectra
- GlycoPeakfinder, a webapp for calculating glycan compositions from mass data

The canonical online version of EuroCarbDB was hosted by the European Bioinformatics Institute at www.ebi.ac.uk up to 2012, and then relax.organ.su.se.

EuroCarb code has since been incorporated into and extended by UniCarb-DB, which also includes the work of the defunct GlycoSuite database.
