= ProSAS =

Content
- Description: alternative splicing in the context of protein structures.

Contact
- Research center: LMU Munich
- Authors: Fabian Birzele
- Primary citation: Birzele & al. (2008)
- Release date: 2007

Access
- Website: http://www.bio.ifi.lmu.de/ProSAS.

ProSAS is a database describing the effects of splicing on the structure of a protein

== See also ==
- Alternative splicing
- Protein structure
