= Euro-BioImaging =

European life sciences research infrastructure

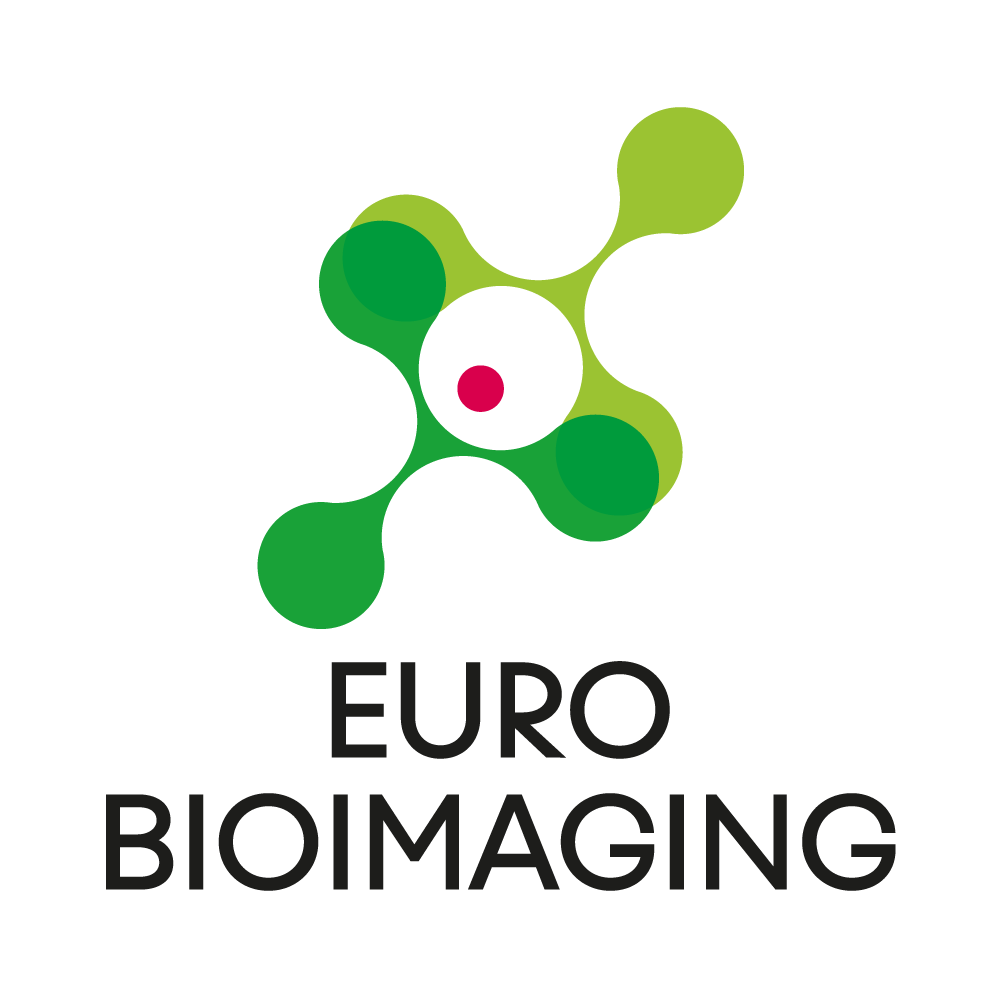
- Abbreviation: Euro-BioImaging
- Formation: 2019
- Type: European Research Infrastructure Consortium
- Purpose: Biological and biomedical imaging research infrastructure
- Headquarters: Turku, Finland
- Locations: Distributed across Europe with Hub sites in: Turku, Finland (Statutory Seat); Heidelberg, Germany (EMBL Bio-Hub); Torino, Italy (Med-Hub)
- Services: Open access imaging technologies, training, image data services
- Members: 19 members (18 countries + EMBL) as of 2024
- Director General: John Eriksson
- Bio-Hub Section Director: Antje Keppler
- Med-Hub Section Director: Linda Chaabane
- Main organ: Euro-BioImaging Board
- Website: www.eurobioimaging.eu

Euro-BioImaging is a European, publicly funded, not-for-profit research infrastructure that provides open access to biological and biomedical imaging technologies, services, and resources for researchers in Europe and internationally. It is a pan-european organization with headquarters in Turku, Finland.

It was established in 2019 as a European Research Infrastructure Consortium (ERIC) and is listed as a landmark on the European Strategy Forum on Research Infrastructures (ESFRI) roadmap. The infrastructure provides access to imaging facilities and expertise, training in imaging methods, and image data services.

Euro-BioImaging is part of a wider set of initiatives in the European Union aimed at improving regional capacity for research data management and for advancing the application of the FAIR principles for research data.

== Support of bioimaging ==
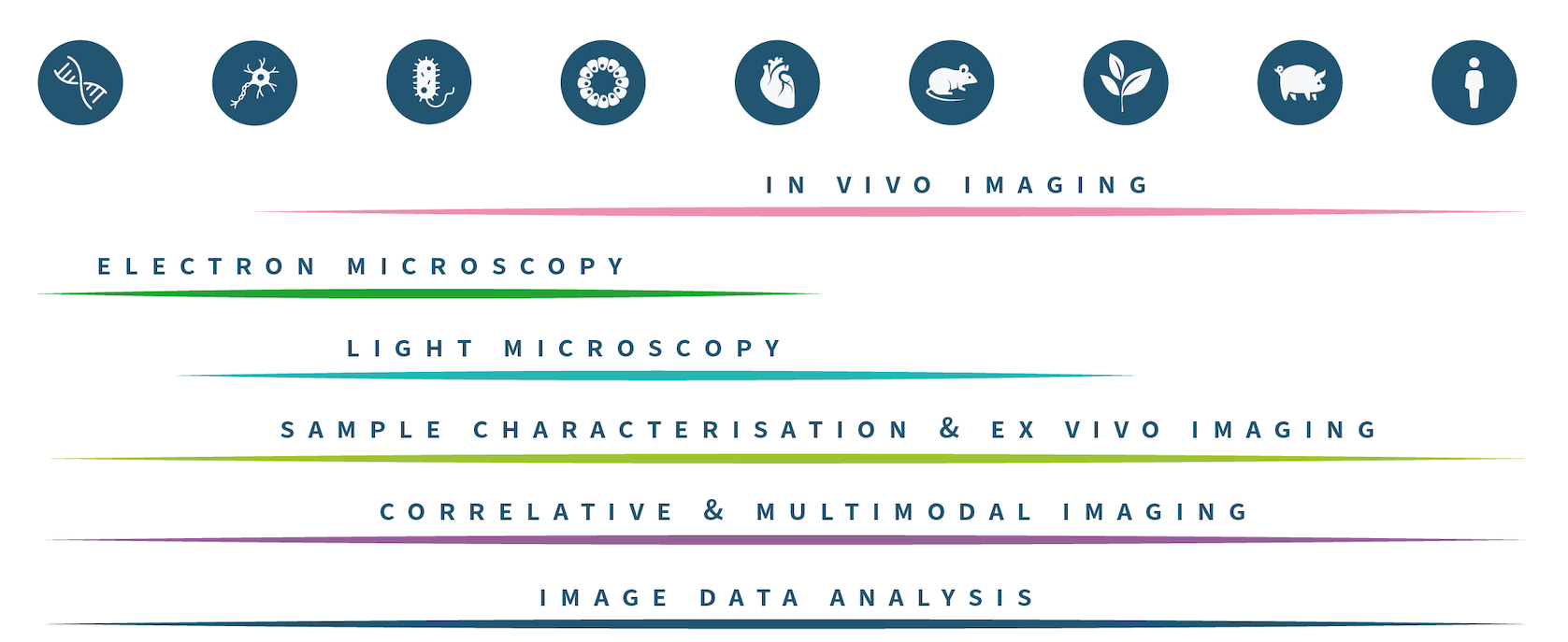
Overview of technologies provided by member nodes of the consortium and their scales.

The field of bioimaging concerns itself with the imaging of biological materials using equipments including microscopes and CT-scans. The core facilities affiliated with Euro-Bioimaging provide public access to techniques for probing samples, including:

- In-vivo imaging, performed with techniques such as micro-CT, magnetoencephalography (MEG), magnetic resonance imaging (MRI) and positron emission tomography (PET).
- Light microscopy techniques, including confocal microscopy and high-content screening
- Electron microscopy techniques, as transmission electron microscopy (TEM), scanning electron microscopy (SEM), cryo-electron microscopy (cryo-EM), and volume electron microscopy (vEM).
- Multimodal imaging, including correlative light and electron microscopy (CLEM), mass spectrometry-based imaging, spatial transcriptomics and elemental and chemical imaging.

The research infrastructure also provides support on sample processing, image analysis and data management, aligned with the FAIR principles. Applications for using technologies in Euro-BioImaging facilities are open to the public and requested through an centralised online portal.

== Organization ==
Euro-BioImaging Nodes and facilities across Europe as of December 2025

=== Membership and nodes ===
Euro-BioImaging operates as a distributed infrastructure. Central coordination is provided by three Hub sites, while imaging services are delivered through facilities known as Nodes. Nodes are present in 19 countries, and access to their services can be requested by researchers worldwide. Following an expansion in 2024 that included the addition of six new Nodes from Spain and Belgium, as well as upgrades to existing Nodes, Euro-BioImaging comprised 40 Nodes and approximately 300 facilities as of early 2026.

The infrastructure is supported by 18 member states and the European Molecular Biology Laboratory (EMBL). The tripartite Hub is located in Finland (Statutory Seat), Italy (Med-Hub, for biomedical imaging), and Germany at EMBL Heidelberg (Bio-Hub, for biological imaging).

Euro-BioImaging Nodes by Country
| Country | Node |
|---|---|
| Austria | Austrian BioImaging/CMI |
| Belgium | Flanders BioImaging Imaging Node |
| Bulgaria | Sofia BioImaging Node - Advanced Light Microscopy Node Sofia Bulgaria |
| Czech Republic | Advanced Light and Electron Microscopy Node Prague CZ |
| Czech Republic | Multimodal Imaging Node Brno |
| Czech Republic | Center for Advanced Preclinical Imaging (CAPI) |
| Denmark | Danish BioImaging Node |
| (European Union) European Molecular Biology Laboratory (EMBL) | Euro-BioImaging EMBL-Node |
| Finland | Finnish Advanced Microscopy Node |
| Finland | Finnish Biomedical Imaging Node |
| France | French BioImaging Node |
| France | France Life Imaging (planned) |
| Hungary | Cellular Imaging Hungary |
| Hungary | Medical and Preclinical Imaging Hungary |
| Israel | Israel BioImaging |
| Italy | Advanced Light Microscopy Italian Node |
| Italy | Digital Imaging Multimodal Platform Neuromed - DIMP NEUROMED |
| Italy | Molecular Imaging Italian Node |
| Italy | Phase Contrast Imaging Flagship Node Trieste |
| Netherlands | Advanced NL Microscopy Node (planned) |
| Netherlands | Dutch High Field Imaging Hub |
| Netherlands | Facility of Multimodal Imaging - AMMI Maastricht |
| Netherlands | Preclinical Imaging Centre (PRIME) - Molecular Imaging Dutch Node |
| Netherlands | Population Imaging Flagship Node Rotterdam |
| Netherlands | Challenges Framework Flagship Node |
| Norway | NorMIC Oslo - Advanced Light Microscopy Node Oslo |
| Norway | NORMOLIM - Norwegian Molecular Imaging Infrastructure |
| Poland | Advanced Light Microscopy Node Poland |
| Portugal | Brain Imaging Network (BIN) |
| Portugal | Portuguese Platform of BioImaging (PPBI) |
| Slovenia | SiMBION Node |
| Spain | Barcelona Live and Intravital |
| Spain | Barcelona Mesoscopic Imaging Node |
| Spain | Barcelona Super-Resolution Light and Nanoscopy Node |
| Spain | Bilbao Node |
| Spain | Madrid Advanced Microscopy Center (MAdMiC) |
| Spain | Smart Optical Microscopy (SOM) Node |
| Spain | Radiology and Medical Imaging Valencia |
| Sweden | Swedish National Microscopy Infrastructure (NMI) |
| United Kingdom | The UK Node |

== Partnerships and collaboration ==
Euro-BioImaging collaborates with national imaging infrastructures, research institutions, universities, and industry partners across Europe. It participates in the ERIC Forum alongside other European Research Infrastructure Consortia, and coordinates with the other Life Science Research Infrastructures.

Euro-BioImaging is a founding member of Global BioImaging, an international network of imaging facilities, infrastructures, and imaging communities. Through Global BioImaging, Euro-BioImaging has established collaborative relationships with imaging infrastructures in Australia, Canada, India, Japan, Singapore, Uruguay, and other regions.

The Euro-BioImaging Industry Board (EBIB) was established in 2014 to facilitate collaboration between the life sciences industry and academic research. According to Euro-BioImaging, the EBIB's objectives include promoting cross-sector collaboration, facilitating communication between technology providers and users, and supporting technology development and testing at Euro-BioImaging Nodes.

== Research and funded projects ==
Euro-BioImaging has received support from the European Commission via Horizon Europe projects, which provide funding for user access at Nodes, development of image data services, and technology development. The funding included support for the projects AI4Life, ISIDORe, AgroServ, ILLUMINATE, RE-IMAGINE-CROPS, and foundingGIDE.

Research conducted at Euro-BioImaging Nodes spans areas including infectious disease, neuroscience, and cancer. Euro-BioImaging has been described in published research as a key infrastructure supporting cancer imaging research in Europe.

== See also ==
- European Research Infrastructure Consortium
- FAIR data
- European Molecular Biology Laboratory
