= Research infrastructure =

Facilities, resources and services that support scientific research

A research infrastructure (RI) is a facility, resource or service used by the scientific community to conduct research. The term covers a wide range of assets, from a single large instrument such as a particle accelerator or telescope, through geographically distributed networks of laboratories or monitoring stations, to purely digital resources such as databases, archives and computing systems. Research infrastructures typically also include the specialist staff needed to operate them.

Because they often require investment beyond the means of a single institution or country, research infrastructures are usually funded from public sources and planned through national or multinational strategies. They have become a distinct object of science policy since the early 2000s, with dedicated coordination bodies, periodic roadmaps and specialised legal forms developed to support their construction and operation.

== Definition ==
There is no single agreed definition of a research infrastructure, and the boundaries of the term vary between jurisdictions and funding programmes. A systematic review of the science policy and management literature found no firm inclusion or exclusion criteria for what counts as a large-scale research infrastructure, and identified the absence of such criteria as a gap hindering analysis, planning and evaluation. In a workshop paper prepared jointly with the European Strategy Forum on Research Infrastructures (ESFRI), the OECD noted that the label has been applied to individual pieces of large equipment such as an electron microscope, to extensive networks of monitoring sensors, to databases accessible only online, and to complex international projects spanning several continents.

In European Union law, Article 2 of the Regulation establishing Horizon Europe defines research infrastructures as facilities that provide resources and services to research communities so that they can carry out research and foster innovation. The definition expressly includes the associated human resources; major equipment or sets of instruments; knowledge-related facilities such as collections, archives and scientific data infrastructures; and computing systems and communication networks.

The National Science Foundation (NSF) in the United States defines facilities as shared-use infrastructure, instrumentation and equipment accessible to a broad community of researchers or educators, noting that they may be centralised or consist of distributed installations.

The Australian Government uses the term national research infrastructure for the facilities, tools, equipment and other resources needed to perform research, together with the experts needed to run them, and observes that such infrastructure may be physical, such as a supercomputer or microscope, or intangible, such as a data collection or software platform.

=== Relationship to big science ===
The term overlaps with, but is not equivalent to, big science. Reviewing an edited volume on the two concepts, a commentator in Metascience observed that they belong to different discursive universes: big science to the scholarly study of science, and research infrastructure to the world of science policy and administration, with the latter having acquired most of its policy currency in Europe. Large-scale research infrastructures are treated in the literature as a subtype of research infrastructure distinguished by scale, with examples including the Large Hadron Collider at CERN and the Institut Laue–Langevin.

== Types ==
Research infrastructures are commonly classified by their physical configuration. Single-sited infrastructures concentrate their facilities at one location; distributed infrastructures coordinate facilities located in several places, often in different countries, under common governance; and virtual infrastructures provide services electronically without a central physical facility. The OECD treated large single-site facilities and geographically distributed infrastructures in separate studies, observing that distributed infrastructures have grown in importance in disciplines such as the biological, environmental and social sciences, which until relatively recently did not require large or complex shared equipment.

Infrastructures are also distinguished by scale and by the breadth of the community they serve. The OECD has noted that very large international infrastructures, national infrastructures and smaller institutional core facilities each require strategies suited to their characteristics. The distinction matters for funding: the NSF, for example, operates separate funding envelopes for major multi-user facilities and for mid-scale research infrastructure.

Digital and data-oriented infrastructures are sometimes treated as a category of their own, described variously as e-infrastructure, cyberinfrastructure or research data infrastructure. In Australia, digital infrastructure of this kind is funded alongside physical facilities within the same national programme.

== Lifecycle ==
Research infrastructures are generally understood to pass through a sequence of phases: conceptual design, a preparatory phase in which governance and funding are negotiated, construction or implementation, operation, periodic upgrade, and eventually decommissioning or repurposing. The OECD examined policies intended to strengthen the effectiveness and sustainability of infrastructures across this entire lifecycle, including their dismantling or potential reuse.

The phases are treated separately in budgeting. At the NSF, initial design work and post-construction operations and maintenance are funded from the agency's research account, while most construction is funded from a dedicated capital account. ESFRI applies a comparable distinction in its roadmap, where infrastructures in preparation or construction are designated Projects and those that are operational or have a confirmed implementation timetable become Landmarks.

Long lead times are characteristic. The Australian Government has observed that providing infrastructure of the quality and scale required for cutting-edge research requires nationwide, long-term planning.

== Governance and legal form ==
Research infrastructures adopt a variety of legal forms. Long-established multinational facilities have generally been created as international organisations founded on intergovernmental treaties, while smaller or national infrastructures are typically hosted by a university, research organisation or national legal entity.

In 2009 the European Union created a dedicated legal form, the European Research Infrastructure Consortium (ERIC), intended to fill the gap between treaty-based international organisations and national legal entities. An ERIC is established by a decision of the European Commission, has legal personality recognised in all EU member states, and is treated as an international body for the purposes of exemption from value-added tax and excise duty.

The OECD has examined alternatives used elsewhere, including the Belgian international non-profit association and a Uruguayan not-for-profit international organisation status, noting that these do not confer the tax exemption that is a distinguishing feature of the ERIC. It also recorded a perceived advantage of such instruments for larger undertakings: at national level, ministerial support may be sufficient to join them, without the lengthier parliamentary processes that establishing an intergovernmental organisation can require.

== Funding and planning ==
=== Europe ===
ESFRI was created in 2002 following a mandate from the Competitiveness Council of the previous year, with the task of coordinating a strategic approach to research infrastructures. Its principal instruments are the Landscape Analysis, which surveys existing European capacity and identifies gaps, and the Roadmap, which identifies priority infrastructures.

The first Roadmap was published in 2006 with 35 projects and was updated in 2008, 2010, 2016, 2018 and 2021. The 2021 edition listed 41 Landmarks and 22 Projects, with total investment in those facilities estimated by the Council of the European Union to exceed €20 billion; the 11 new projects entering that edition represented planned investment of over €4 billion, the largest such figure since the roadmap began. A further update was launched in 2024, with a submission deadline of April 2025 and completion planned for 2026, giving greater weight to financial sustainability and adding environmental considerations.

At Union level, research infrastructures form a dedicated part of the framework programme for research and innovation, which funds transnational and virtual access for researchers, training, and work to integrate and improve the services infrastructures provide.

=== United States ===
The NSF supports facility construction chiefly through the Major Research Equipment and Facilities Construction (MREFC) account, established in the 1995 financial year as an agency-wide capital account. It funds the construction stage of major facilities, broadly those costing around $100 million or more, together with mid-scale projects of roughly $20 million to $100 million. The facilities supported include instrumentation networks, observatories, accelerators, telescopes, research vessels, aircraft and simulators.

Oversight is exercised by a Chief Officer for Research Facilities within the Office of the Director, working with the agency's Research Infrastructure Office, an arrangement required by the American Innovation and Competitiveness Act. Since the 2009 financial year, major facility projects funded from the MREFC account have been subject to a policy of no cost overruns, requiring realistic and well-supported total project cost estimates.

=== Australia ===
Australia has funded national research infrastructure since 2004 through the National Collaborative Research Infrastructure Strategy (NCRIS), which coordinates open access, targeted specialisation and co-funding across the country. The programme has supported 26 funded projects forming a network of more than 250 partners and employing over 3,000 staff. By 2026 the Australian Government had invested A$5.5 billion in NCRIS over two decades, supporting more than 130,000 users a year.

Investment is guided by National Research Infrastructure Roadmaps, produced every five years; a 2026 Roadmap was under development to succeed the 2021 edition. Commentators marking the programme's twentieth anniversary noted that, despite bipartisan support, there was at that point no formal commitment to sustain NCRIS at existing levels beyond the 2028–29 financial year.

== Access ==
A defining characteristic of research infrastructures is that they are shared rather than dedicated to a single research group. Access is typically granted on the basis of merit, following peer review of proposals, and is often provided free of charge at the point of use because the underlying service capacity is limited. European framework programme funding supports transnational access, in which researchers visit or use a facility in another country, and virtual access, in which services are delivered remotely.

The European Commission describes research infrastructures as open and accessible to researchers from Europe and beyond, and has funded projects offering such access across fields including nuclear and particle physics, polar research, agriculture and oncology.

== Impact assessment ==
Because research infrastructures represent a growing share of public research investment, funders and managers face increasing expectations to demonstrate results, and the assessment of scientific and socio-economic impact has become an established field of study. In 2019 the OECD published a reference framework for assessing the scientific and socio-economic impact of research infrastructures, offering a generic tool adaptable to different types of infrastructure and different lifecycle stages, and including a set of core impact indicators.

Approaches have included cost-benefit analysis before investment or upgrade, measurement of scientific output and of funding attracted during operation, assessment of effects on suppliers through procurement, and evaluation of training and human-resource effects. The EU-funded RI-PATHS project developed a modular impact-assessment framework, with a generic core model and more detailed sub-models, covering development, operation and eventual decommissioning.

Assessment remains contested in method. Reviewers have observed that socio-economic impact assessments tend in practice to emphasise quantifiable economic and scientific-productivity measures over social contribution, which is harder to capture. A social cost-benefit analysis of a large physics infrastructure by Florio, Forte and Sirtori, discussed in a later review of assessment methods, estimated that the present value of the resulting publications repaid only about 2% of total cost, illustrating that the case for such facilities does not rest on publication output alone.

More recently, the OECD has examined how infrastructures can operate as ecosystems rather than in isolation, in order to improve access to data, enable interdisciplinary work and strengthen societal impact.

== See also ==
- European Research Infrastructure Consortium
- European Research Area
- Cyberinfrastructure
- Open Science Infrastructure
- Data infrastructure
- Big Science
