= TassDB =

Content
- Description: alternative tandem splice sites.

Contact
- Primary citation: Hiller & al. (2007)
- Release date: 2006

Access
- Website: http://helios.informatik.uni-freiburg.de/TassDB/

TassDB (TAndem Splice Site DataBase) is a database of tandem splice sites of eight species

== See also ==
- Alternative splicing
