= ChimerDB =

Content
- Description: fusion sequences.

Contact
- Research center: Ewha Womans University, Seoul 120-750, Korea.
- Laboratory: Division of Molecular Life Sciences
- Authors: Namshin Kim
- Primary citation: Kim & al. (2006)

Access
- Website: http://genome.ewha.ac.kr/ChimerDB/

ChimerDB in computational biology is a database of fusion sequences.

ChimerDB currently consists of three searchable datasets.

- ChimerKB is a curated knowledge base of 1,066 fusion genes sourced from publicly available scientific literature.
- ChimerPub provides continuously updated descriptions on fusion genes text mined from publications.
- ChimerSeq is a database of RNA-seq data of fusion sequences downloaded from the TCGA data portal.

== See also ==
- ECgene
- Fusion gene
