= Alternative Splicing Annotation Project =

2003–2013 UCLA database for alternative splicing data

ASAP

Content
- Description: comparative genomics of alternative splicing.
- Organisms: 15 animal species

Contact
- Research center: University of California
- Laboratory: Department of Chemistry and Biochemistry
- Authors: Namshin Kim
- Primary citation: Kim & al. (2007)
- Release date: 2003

Access
- Website: bioinformatics.ucla.edu/ASAP2 (archive)
- Download URL: download

Miscellaneous
- Versioning: 2

Alternative Splicing Annotation Project (ASAP) in computational biology was a database for alternative splicing data maintained by the University of California from 2003 to 2013. The purpose of ASAP was to provide a source for data mining projects by consolidating the information generated by genomics and proteomics researchers.

== See also ==
- AspicDB
- ECgene
- RNA splicing
