= LOFAR =

LOFAR may refer to:

- Low-Frequency Array, a large radio telescope system based in the Netherlands
- Low Frequency Analyzer and Recorder and Low Frequency Analysis and Recording, for low-frequency sounds
