= Lennart Philipson =

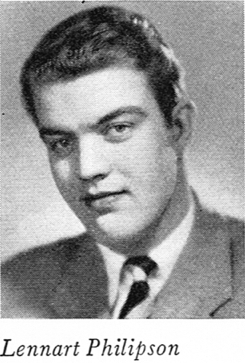
Carl Lennart Philipson

Carl Lennart Philipson (July 16, 1929 – June 26, 2011) was a Swedish virologist and professor at Karolinska Institute. He is well known for his research in respiratory viruses and his direction over several research institutions.

== Career ==
Philipson earned his MD in 1957 and PhD in 1958 at Uppsala University, working with Arne Tiselius. He came to the United States in 1959 to do a postdoc at the Rockefeller University in virology, before returning to Sweden's Uppsala University to establish his own laboratory in 1961 with Jan Pontén.

He did two sabbaticals in the United States. In 1971 in the laboratory of Jim Darnell, and in 1977 in the laboratory of David Baltimore.

In 1967, he was appointed director of the Wallenberg Laboratory in Sweden. In 1982, he was appointed to be the second director general of the European Molecular Biology Laboratory (EMBL), which he ran until 1993. He resigned after being unable to convince the council to increase the funding by 15-20% each year. At that point, he returned to the US to be the founding director of the Skirball Institute of Biomolecular Medicine at the New York University School of Medicine. After five years, he returned to Sweden to join the Karolinska Institute, where he remained until his death in 2011.

He was elected to the US National Academy of Sciences in 1992.

In 2015, EMBL established the Lennart Philipson Award for translational research. He and his wife founded the Malin and Lennart Philipson Foundation. It is now run by his widow, and awards prizes to promising graduate students and postdocs.
