= Wellcome Genome Campus =

Scientific research campus in Hinxton, Cambridgeshire, England

Coordinates: 52°05′N 0°11′E

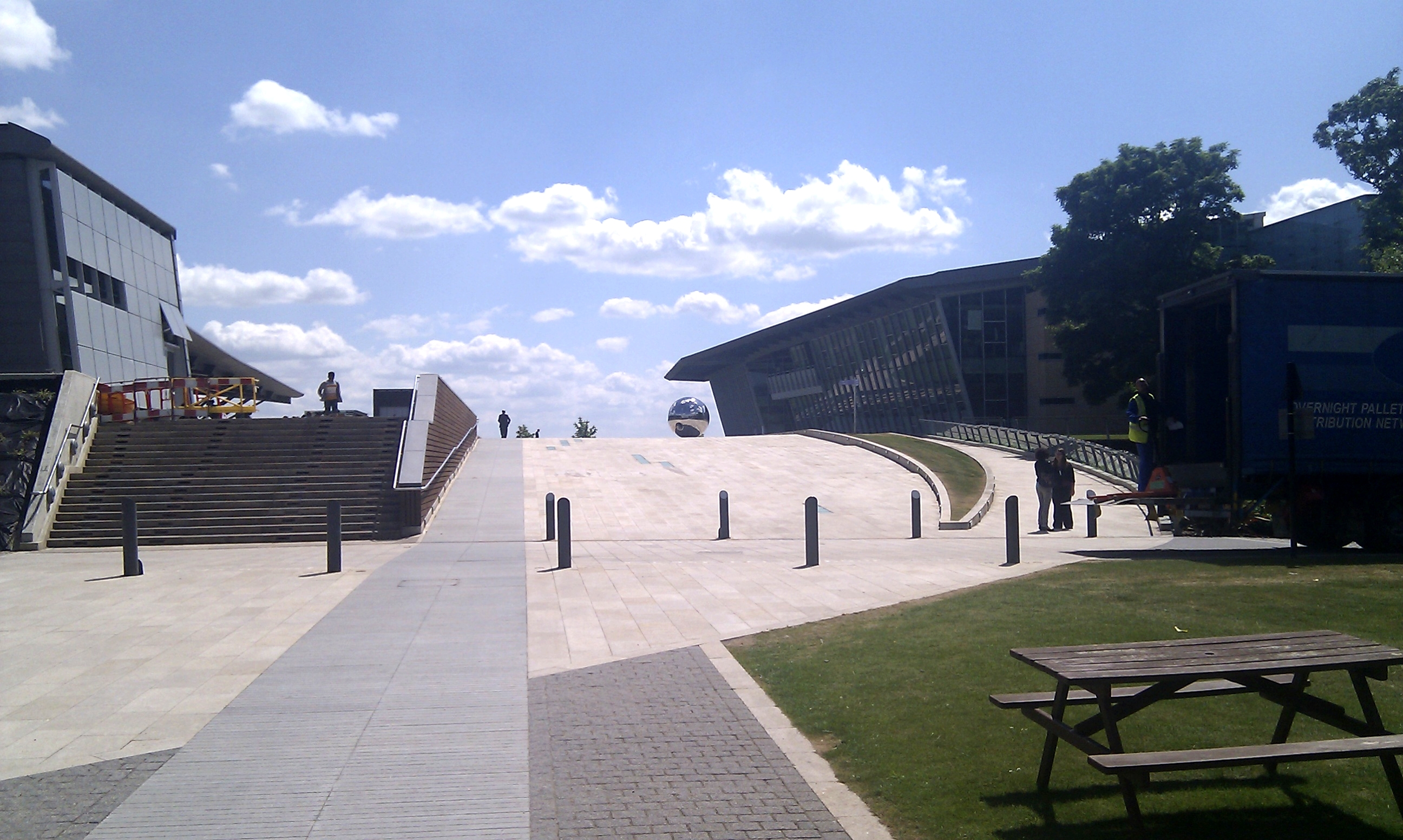
- The campus grounds, 2010
- Established: 1993
- Field of research: Genomics; Bioinformatics
- Staff: c. 1,400
- Location: Wellcome Genome Campus, Hinxton, Saffron Walden, CB10 1SA, Hinxton, Cambridgeshire, UK
- Affiliations: Wellcome Trust; European Molecular Biology Laboratory; University of Cambridge; Medical Research Council (MRC)
- Nobel laureates: John Sulston
- Website: www.wellcomegenomecampus.org

The Wellcome Genome Campus is a scientific research campus built in the grounds of Hinxton Hall, Hinxton in Cambridgeshire, England.

== Campus ==
The Campus is home to some institutes and organisations in genomics and computational biology. The Campus is part of the Wellcome Trust, a global charitable foundation that exists to improve health, and houses the Wellcome Sanger Institute, the European Bioinformatics Institute (EBI), the bioinformatics outstation of the European Molecular Biology Laboratory (EMBL), and a number of biotech companies whose UK offices are located in the BioData Innovation Centre acting as an incubator for businesses of all sizes.

In 2020, the South Cambridgeshire District Council granted outline planning permission for an expansion of the Campus. The expansion will increase the overall Campus grounds from 125 acres to 440 acres. The first buildings are expected to be completed in 2026.

== Activities ==
At the Campus, genome and biodata research takes place. The Campus provides bioinformatics services and delivers training in genomics and biodata to scientists and clinicians.

== History ==
=== Opening of the campus in 1994 ===
At the time of its official opening by the Princess Royal in 1994, the Wellcome Genome Campus was already home to the Wellcome Sanger Institute (then called the Sanger Centre), the Medical Research Council’s Human Genome Mapping Project Resource Centre, the European Molecular Biology Laboratory’s European Bioinformatics Institute (EMBL-EBI).

Wellcome funded the establishment of the Sanger Centre in 1993 and chose Hinxton as the home for its new genome research institute. Shortly after, EMBL-EBI located on the same site, and the two institutes formed a natural fit, consolidating expertise, facilities and knowledge in one place and enabling both to contribute a major role in the Human Genome Project – a global collaboration to sequence the first ‘reference’ human genome.

One third of the human genome was sequenced for the first time at the Wellcome Trust Sanger Institute, and the data was stored and shared through EMBL-EBI. This was the largest single contribution of any centre to the Human Genome Project, making the Campus and its collaborations uniquely important in the history of genomics.

Since the announcement of the completion of the draft human genome in 2000, and final completion in 2003, rapid progress in sequencing technology has enabled new areas of Science to be opened up for exploration. At its opening in 1994, the Campus housed approximately 400 employees. This has grown to over 2,600 people employed at the Wellcome Genome Campus today, making the Campus a densely concentrated and globally significant cluster for biodata and genomics expertise.

=== Before 1993 ===
The first recorded owner of the estate, in 1506, was the college of Michaelhouse in Cambridge but it wasn’t until the early eighteenth century that the first building – a modest hunting and fishing lodge – was erected by Captain Joseph Richardson of Horseheath. It became a gentleman’s retreat with well-stocked trout ponds and fields full of partridge.

The current Hall was built by John Bromwell Jones in 1748 and remains today as the central three-storey block on the Campus. Opposite the house were stables, a kitchen garden and an orchard, all of which still exist, albeit in altered form.

By 1800 ownership of the Hall and estate had passed to the Green family, who remained until 1920, when the Hall was sold to the Robinsons. During the Second World War, the Hall was used for billeting American soldiers, stationed at the local airbase at Duxford.

In 1953 the Hall and grounds were sold to Tube Investments Plc for us as research laboratories, which closed in the late 1980s. The site remained under their ownership until it was sold to Genome Research Limited in 1992.

=== Construction ===
It was designed by Sheppard Robson, and built by Bovis Construction. The £180m campus was opened by the Princess Royal on Wednesday 8 October 1997, arriving by helicopter.

=== Sanger Institute's History ===
The Wellcome Trust established the Sanger Centre in 1992 to undertake the most ambitious project ever attempted in biology, sequencing the human genome. The new facility developed laboratory infrastructure, robotics, team working and computational approaches on a scale unprecedented in life sciences.

In 2000, the first draft of the human genome was announced with the Sanger Centre championing open access to the data and making the largest contribution to the global collaborative endeavour. Genomes began to convert biology into big data science. The subsequently renamed Wellcome Trust Sanger Institute established long term research programmes to explore and apply genome sequences.
