= Transformer (gene) =

Female-specific protein transformer

Identifiers
- Symbol: Tra
- Pfam: PF06495
- InterPro: IPR010519
Available protein structures:
- Pfam: structures / ECOD
- PDB: RCSB PDB; PDBe; PDBj
- PDBsum: structure summary

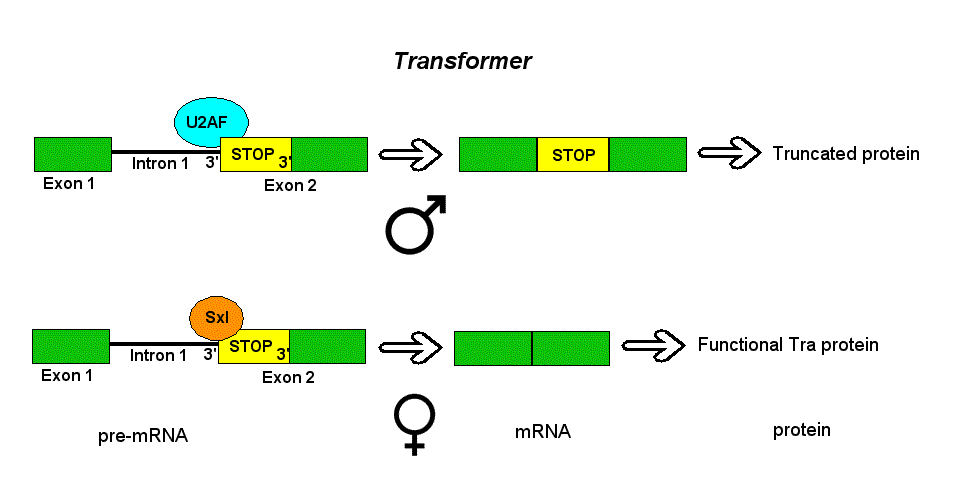
Alternative splicing of the Drosophila Transformer gene product.

Transformer

Identifiers
- Organism: Drosophila melanogaster
- Symbol: tra
- Entrez: 39849
- RefSeq (mRNA): NM_079390.3
- RefSeq (Prot): NP_524114.1
- UniProt: P11596

Other data
- Chromosome: 3L: 16.59 - 16.59 Mb
Search for
- Structures: Swiss-model
- Domains: InterPro

Transformer 2

Identifiers
- Organism: Drosophila melanogaster
- Symbol: tra2
- Entrez: 36619
- RefSeq (mRNA): NM_057416.3
- RefSeq (Prot): NP_476764.1
- UniProt: P19018

Other data
- Chromosome: 2R: 14.6 - 14.6 Mb
Search for
- Structures: Swiss-model
- Domains: InterPro

Transformer (tra) is a family of genes which regulate sex determination in insects such as flies. Among its effects, it (P11596) regulates differences between males and females in Drosophila fruit flies.

The tra-2 gene (P19018) is needed for sexual differentiation in female fruit flies, and for spermatogenesis in the males. It is not in the same protein family as tra, but instead works together with it in the splicing enhancer complex.
