= European Molecular Biology Laboratory =

Molecular biology research institution

Coordinates: 49°23′4.64″N 8°42′36.51″E

- EMBL logo
- Abbreviation: EMBL
- Formation: 1974; 52 years ago
- Type: Research institute
- Purpose: Basic research
- Headquarters: Heidelberg, Germany
- Locations: Barcelona, Spain; Grenoble, France; Hamburg, Germany; Heidelberg, Germany; Hinxton, United Kingdom; Rome, Italy
- Fields: Molecular biology
- Members: Full members (29): Austria; Belgium; Croatia; Czech Republic; Denmark; Estonia; Finland; France; Germany; Greece; Hungary; Iceland; Ireland; Israel; Italy; Latvia; Lithuania; Luxembourg; Malta; Montenegro; Netherlands; Norway; Poland; Portugal; Slovakia; Spain; Sweden; Switzerland; United Kingdom; Prospect member (1): Bulgaria; Associate member (1): Australia
- Director General: Anthony Hyman
- Staff: ~1800
- Website: www.embl.org

The European Molecular Biology Laboratory (EMBL) is an intergovernmental organization dedicated to molecular biology research and is supported by 29 member states, one prospect member state, and one associate member state. EMBL was created in 1974 and is funded by public research money from its member states. Research at EMBL is conducted by more than 110 independent research groups and service teams covering the spectrum of molecular biology.

The Laboratory operates from six sites: the main laboratory in Heidelberg (Germany), and sites in Barcelona (Spain), Grenoble (France), Hamburg (Germany), Hinxton (the European Bioinformatics Institute (EBI), in England), and Rome (Italy). EMBL groups and laboratories perform basic research in molecular biology and molecular medicine as well as train scientists, students, and visitors. The organization aids in the development of services, new instruments and methods, and technology in its member states. Israel is the only full member state located outside Europe.

== History ==
EMBL was the idea of Leó Szilárd, James Watson and John Kendrew. Their goal was to create an international research centre, similar to CERN, to rival the strongly American-dominated field of molecular biology. Kendrew served as the first Director general of EMBL until 1982 and was succeeded by Lennart Philipson. From 1993 to 2005, Fotis Kafatos, served as director and was succeeded by Iain Mattaj, EMBL's fourth director, from 2005 to 2018. In January 2019, Edith Heard became the fifth director of EMBL and the first woman to hold this position.

Heard announced the organisation's five-year scientific programme Molecules to Ecosystems on 19 January 2022.

Heard was followed by Peer Bork who became Interim Director General in March 2025 and led the institute together with Interim Executive Director Ewan Birney. Following the passing of Peer Bork on 16 January 2026, Ewan Birney was appointed as Interim Director General. Anthony Hyman began his term on 31 March 2026.

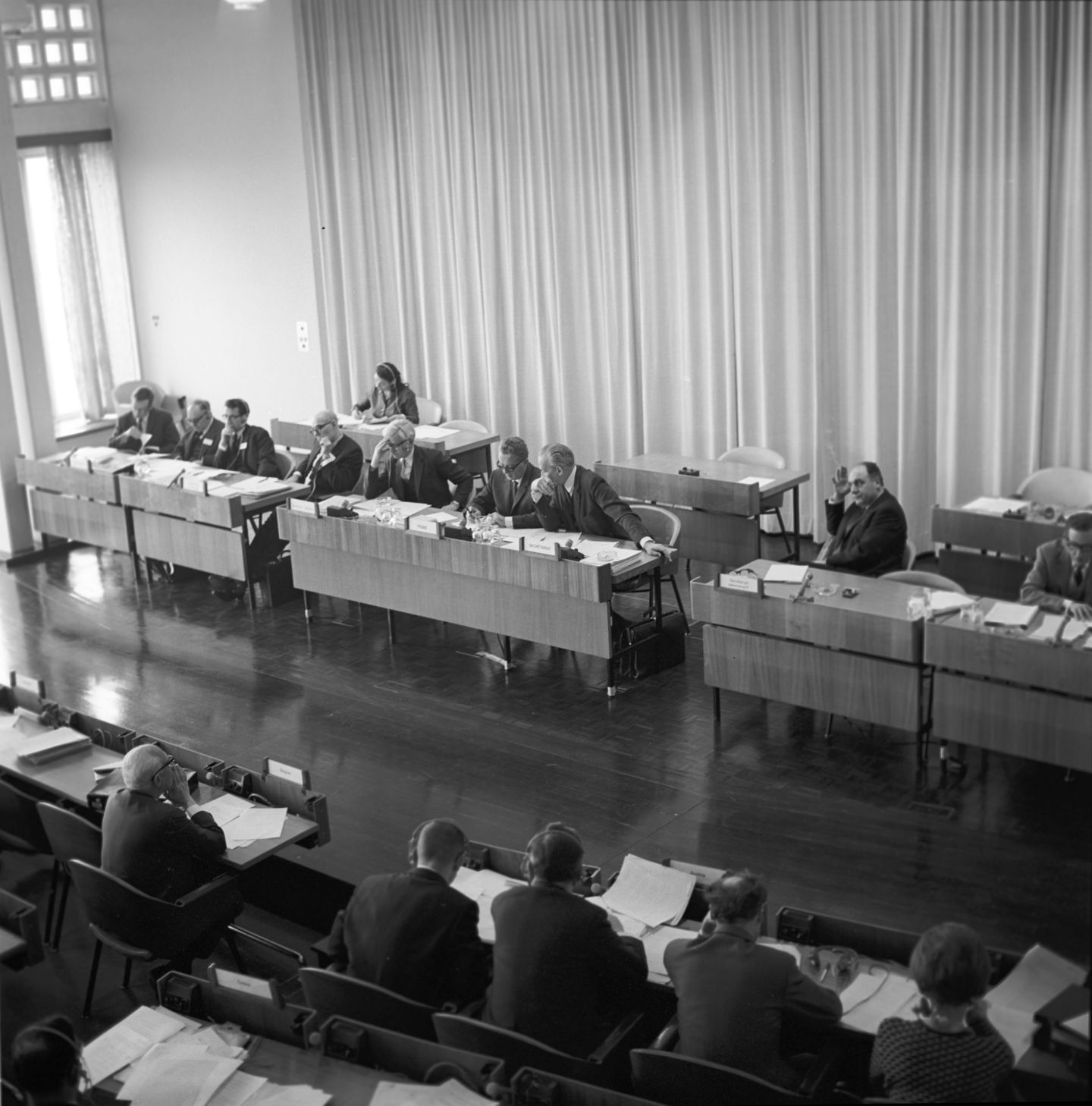
In 1968 the European Molecular Biology Conference was founded at CERN, associating 14 governments with EMBO, providing the organisation with stable funding and scientific independence. This led to the formal establishment of The European Molecular Biology Laboratory (EMBL) in 1974.

== Research ==
Each EMBL site has a specific research field. The EMBL-EBI is a hub for bioinformatics research and services, developing and maintaining a large number of scientific databases that are free of charge. At Grenoble and Hamburg, research is focused on structural biology.

The EMBL Rome site is dedicated to the study of epigenetics and neurobiology. Scientists at EMBL Barcelona are exploring how tissues and organs function and develop, in health and disease. At the headquarters in Heidelberg, there are units in cell biology and biophysics, developmental biology, genome biology, and structural and computational biology, as well as service groups complementing the aforementioned research fields.

Many scientific breakthroughs have been made at EMBL. The first systematic genetic analysis of embryonic development in the fruit fly was conducted at EMBL by Christiane Nüsslein-Volhard and Eric Wieschaus, for which they were awarded the Nobel Prize in Physiology or Medicine in 1995. In the early 1980s, Jacques Dubochet and his team at EMBL developed cryogenic electron microscopy for biological structures. They were rewarded with the 2017 Nobel Prize in Chemistry.

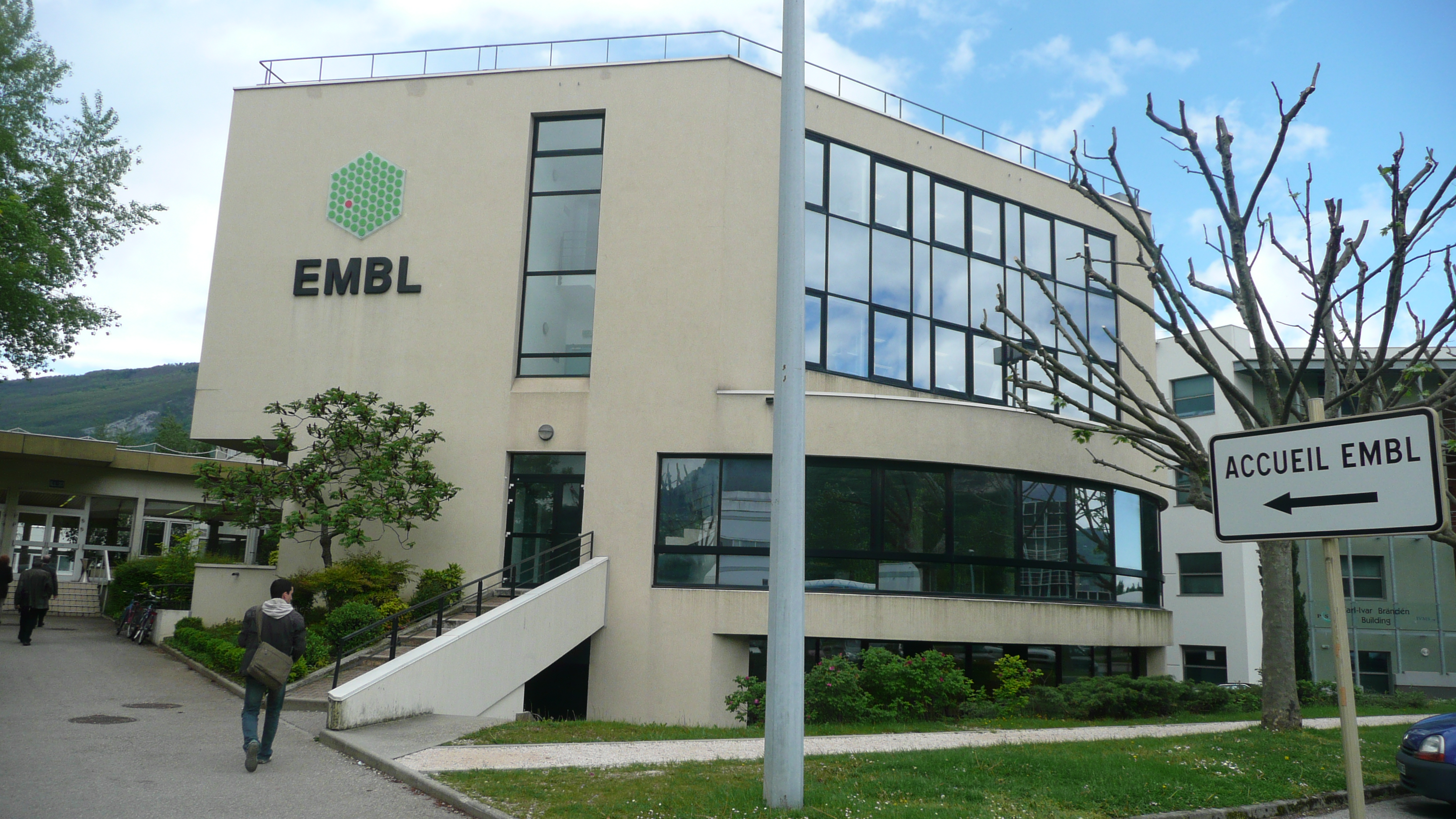
EMBL Grenoble

== Scientific Services ==
EMBL has identified as a core mission the provision of advanced experimental and data services to external researchers, including structural biology, imaging and sequencing facilities at its five European sites. In 2021, EMBL completed a new centre for high-resolution light and electron microscopy at its Heidelberg Headquarters – the EMBL Imaging Centre. The centre is open to visiting scientists worldwide and provides a unique service facility for the life sciences by combining the latest imaging technologies with expert advice and industry-led developments not yet otherwise available. EMBL is a founding member of Euro-BioImaging.

== Training ==
Advanced training is one of EMBL's five core missions. Over the years, the Laboratory has established a number of training activities, of which the EMBL International PhD Programme (EIPP) is the flagship – it has a student body of about 200, and since 1997 has had the right to award its own degree, although currently students receive their degrees from partner universities. Other activities include the postdoctoral programme, including the EMBL Interdisciplinary Postdoctoral programme (EIPOD) and the Visitor Programme.

== EMBL Advanced Training Centre ==
In March 2010, the EMBL Advanced Training Centre (ATC) was inaugurated on the main campus in Heidelberg. Shaped in the form of a double helix, it hosts scientific conferences, seminars and training courses, and provides access to training laboratories and lecture halls.

The ATC also hosts EMBL's European Learning Lab for the Life Sciences (ELLS) which provides training for secondary school teachers on the latest developments in molecular biology, and runs a student outreach program.

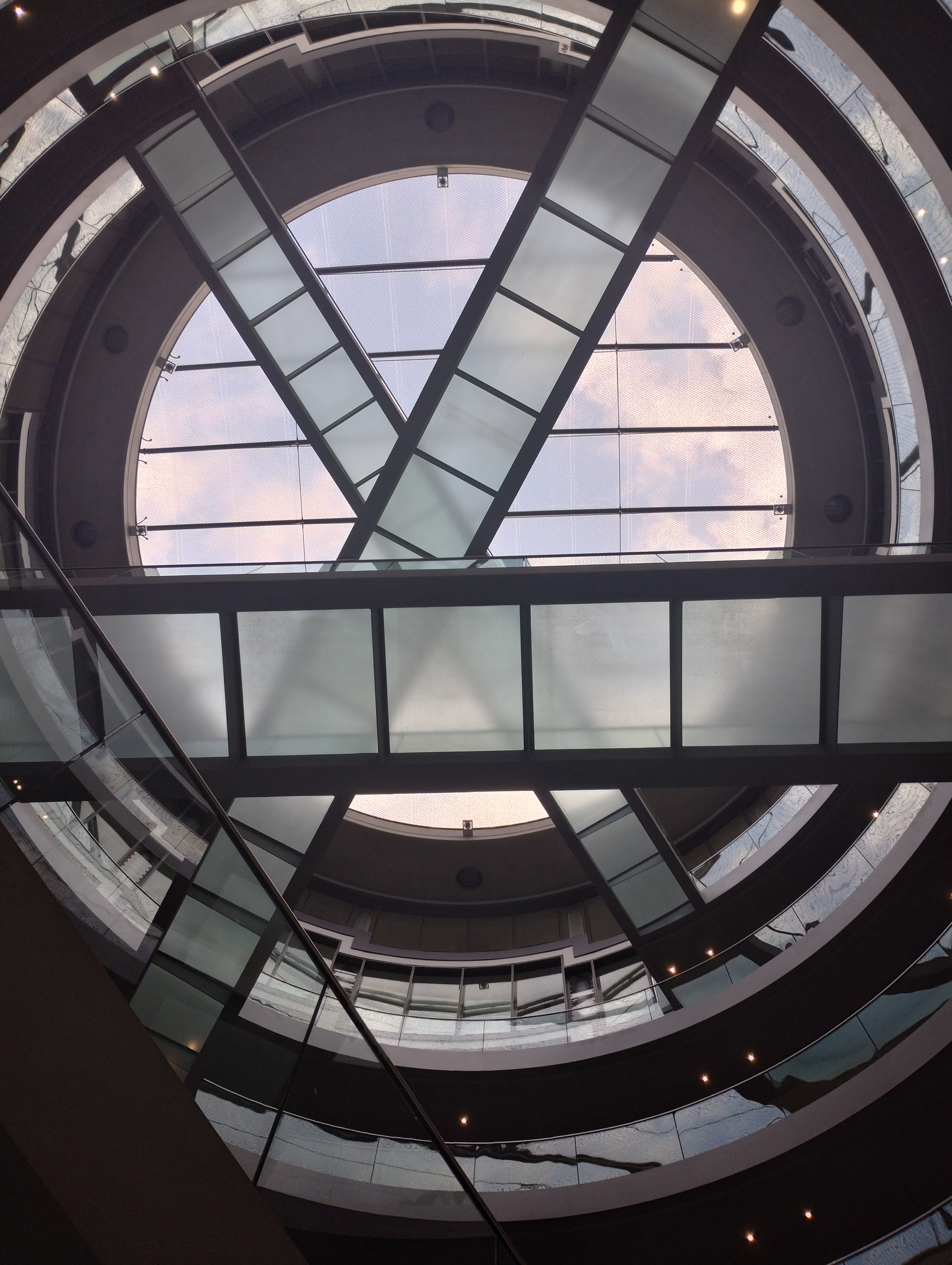
EMBL Heidelberg

== Science and society ==
EMBL also runs an active Science and Society Programme which offers activities and events on current questions in life science research for the general public and the scientific community.

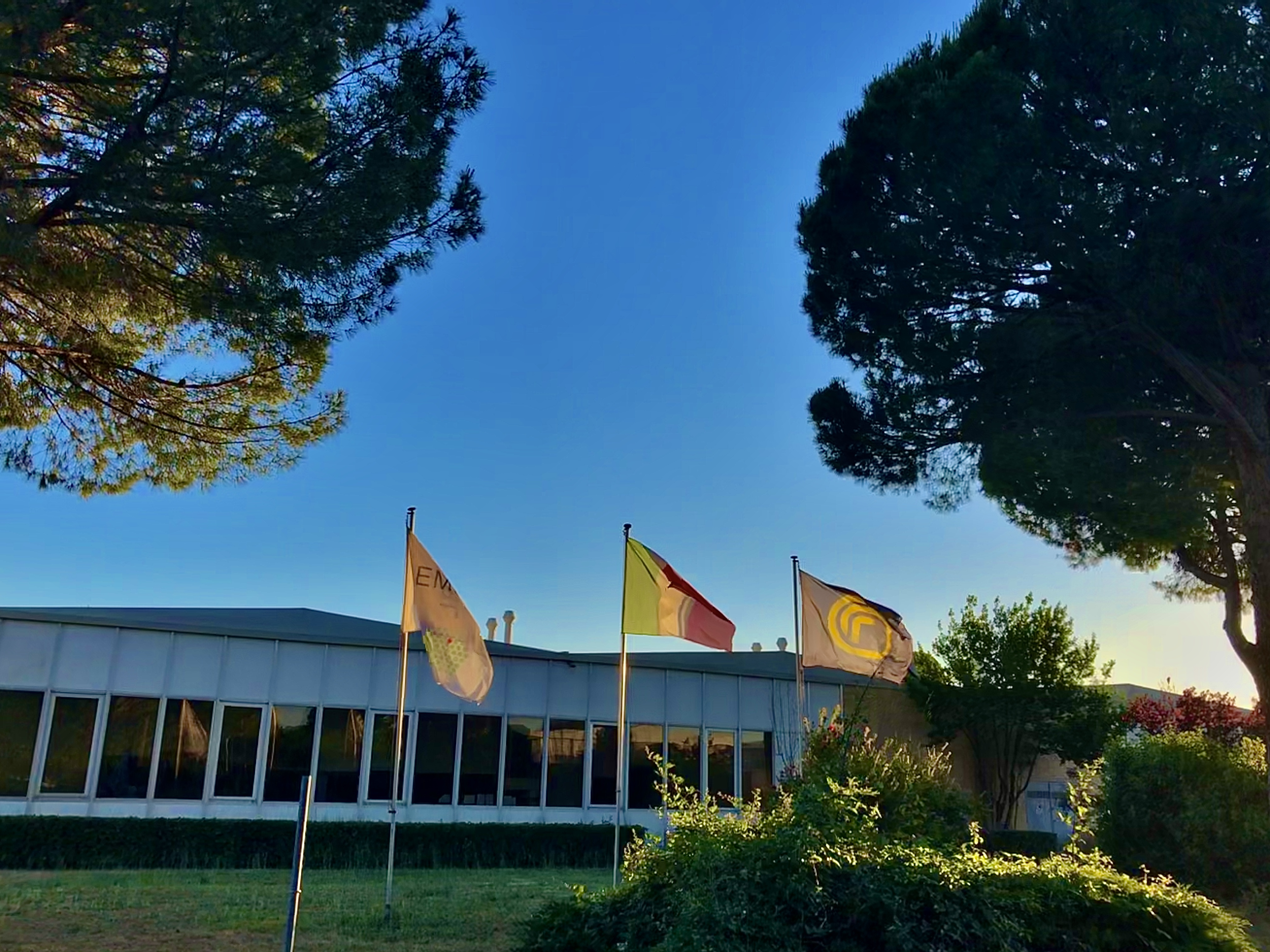
EMBL Rome

== Membership ==

Member states
Associate member states
Prospect member states

EMBL is currently supported by 29 member states, one associate member state, and two prospect member states.

Member states	Year of joining
Austria	1974
Belgium	1990
Croatia	2006
Czech Republic	2014
Denmark	1974
Estonia	2023
Finland	1984
France	1974
Germany	1974
Greece	1984
Hungary	2017
Iceland	2005
Ireland	2003
Israel	1974
Italy	1974
Latvia	2024
Lithuania	2019
Luxembourg	2007
Malta	2016
Montenegro	2018
Netherlands	1974
Norway	1985
Poland	2019
Portugal	1998
Slovakia	2018
Spain	1986
Sweden	1974
Switzerland	1974
United Kingdom	1974
Prospect member state	
Bulgaria	2024
Associate member state	
Australia	2008
Former associate member state	
Argentina	2014–2020

== See also ==
- European Molecular Biology Organization
- European Genome-phenome Archive
