= EDAS =

Spliced human gene database

EDAS.

Content
- Description: databases of alternatively spliced human genes.
- Organisms: Homo Sapiens

Contact
- Authors: R N Nurtdinov
- Primary citation: Nurtdinov et al.

Access
- Website: http://www.gene-bee.msu.ru/edas/

EDAS was a database of alternatively spliced human genes. It is currently defunct.

== See also ==
- AspicDB database
