= Hinxton =

Village in Cambridgeshire, England

Coordinates: 52.083°N 0.183°E

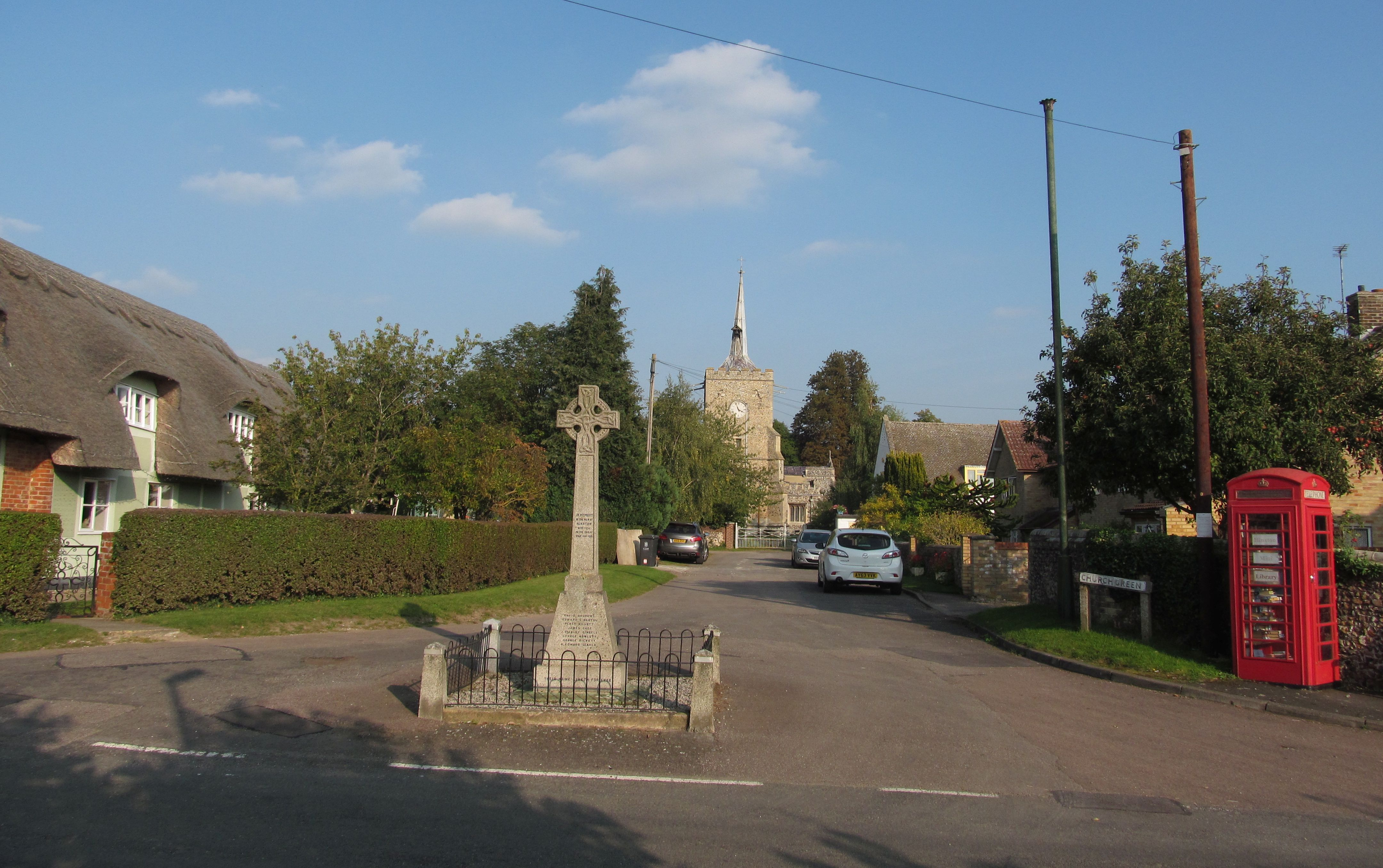
- Village centre: memorial cross, mini-library in a red telephone box, and the parish church

- Location within Cambridgeshire
- Population: 320
- OS grid reference: TL496450
- Shire county: Cambridgeshire
- Region: East
- Country: England
- Sovereign state: United Kingdom
- Post town: SAFFRON WALDEN
- Postcode district: CB10
- Dialling code: 01799
- UK Parliament: South Cambridgeshire

Hinxton is a village in South Cambridgeshire, England.

The River Cam runs through the village, as does the Cambridge to Liverpool Street railway, though the village has no station. Hinxton parish's southern boundaries form the border between Cambridgeshire and Essex. The village is five miles (8.0 km) north-west of Saffron Walden and nine miles (14 km) south of Cambridge. The 2001 population was 315.

Hinxton is the home of the Wellcome Genome Campus, which includes the Wellcome Sanger Institute and the European Bioinformatics Institute.

== History ==
The name Hinxton is a contraction of Hengestestun, "the town of Hengest".

The village of Hinxton is listed in the Domesday Book of 1086 as Hestitona, as Hyngeston in the Ely Registers of 1341 and Hengestone in the Ramsey Chartulary. Its parish church is the medieval St Mary and St John Church.

=== WWII ===
From 1940, MI5 had its 'Home for the Incurables' at a house in the village, possibly Hinxton Grange, where German agents, that could not be fully trusted, were sent; previously this centre was at Addlestone in Surrey. German agents that did not cooperate at all were mostly executed, in weeks, although MI5 did not execute agents in haste. Execution was partly required to merely give some credible reasons, for the German intelligence services, as to why all of the German parachuted agents had quickly disappeared, without giving suspicion to the widespread betrayal that had taken place.

== Hinxton Hall ==
Hinxton Hall, set on an estate of 95 acres (380,000 m^{2}) on the banks of the River Cam, is a Grade II* red-brick building built in the eighteenth century. It is currently used as a meetings venue, hosting the engagement and learning programmes of Wellcome Connecting Science.

=== History ===
The first house on the site of the hall was a modest hunting lodge built by Joseph Richardson of Horseheath in around 1740, before being sold to Thomas Brown of Ickleton in 1748, passing into the possession of his great-niece Mary Holden. Holden's first husband John Bromwell Jones pulled down the original house and built the present hall between 1748 and 1756. Subsequent owners extended the property and land.

In 1953, the owner, Col. R. P. W. Adeane of Babraham, sold the hall and estate to Tube Investments Ltd. for use as research laboratories, and new buildings were added on the grounds as laboratories. In 1992, the Hall and its estate was bought by the Wellcome Trust. The Hall was used by the Wellcome Sanger Institute and housed the early years of the UK's contribution to the Human Genome Project.

Hinxton Hall is referenced in E.M. Forster's novel The Longest Journey as the home of Emily Failing, the eccentric aunt of leading character Rickie Elliot.

== Hinxton Mill ==
Hinxton Mill straddles the River Cam as it flows northward through the village. Although the present mill was built in the seventeenth century, it is almost certainly the site of the mill mentioned in the Domesday Book of 1086.

The mill, used for grinding corn, ceased operation in 1955 and fell into disrepair until being restored in the 1980s with help from Cambridge Past, Present and Future who now own the building; it is open to visitors on about six days per year.

== Hinxton Village Hall ==
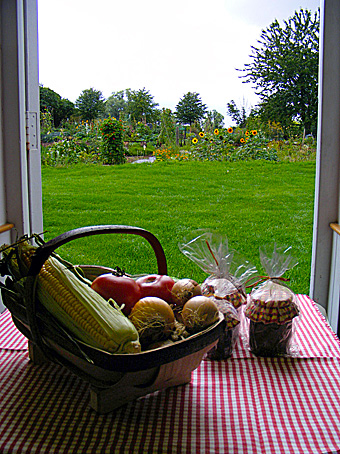
The grounds from the hall

The flint and brick building lies at the heart of the village, and dates back to Victorian times. Its community role began when the oldest part of the hall was opened as a reading room for villagers, a place to meet and keep up with the news and share books. Generations of Hinxton residents have cared for the building and over the last five years it has undergone a programme of sympathetic updating – to combine the best of traditional village life with modern amenities.

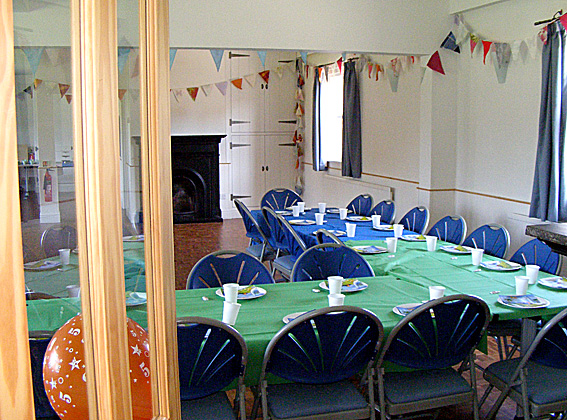
Party time

The village hall is in the High Street, next to the recreation ground. It can be hired for family parties, business and commercial events.

== Village life ==
The village is home to the Red Lion public house, a seventeenth-century building that has been in use as a public house since at least 1841, though there are records of an inn in Hinxton in 1744.

== See also ==
- The Hundred Parishes
