= ASPicDB =

Database of annotations of alternative splicing patterns of human genes

Content
- Description: Alternative splicing prediction
- Organisms: Homo sapiens

Contact
- Research center: Consiglio Nazionale delle Ricerche, Bari
- Laboratory: Istituto Biomembrane e Bioenergetica
- Primary citation: PMID 21051348
- Release date: 2011

Access
- Website: srv00.recas.ba.infn.it/ASPicDB

ASPicDB is a database of human protein variants generated by alternative splicing, a process by which the exons of the RNA produced by transcription of a gene are reconnected in multiple ways during RNA splicing.

== See also ==
- Alternative splicing
- Alternative splicing annotation project
- EDAS
