= Alternative splicing =

Process by which a gene can code for multiple proteins

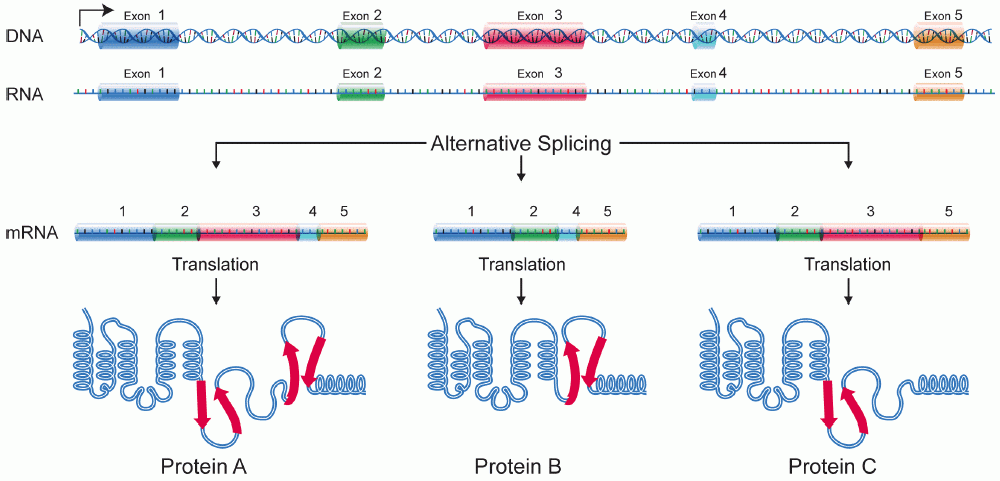
Alternative splicing produces three protein isoforms. Protein A includes all of the exons, whereas Proteins B and C result from exon skipping.

Alternative splicing, alternative RNA splicing, or differential splicing is an alternative splicing process during gene expression that allows a single gene to produce different splice variants. For example, some exons of a gene may be included within or excluded from the final RNA product of the gene. This means the exons are joined in different combinations, leading to different splice variants. In the case of protein-coding genes, the proteins translated from these splice variants may contain differences in their amino acid sequence and in their biological functions (see Figure).

Biologically relevant alternative splicing occurs as a normal phenomenon in eukaryotes, where it increases the number of proteins that can be encoded by the genome. In humans, it is widely believed that ~95% of multi-exonic genes are alternatively spliced to produce functional alternative products from the same gene but many scientists believe that most of the observed splice variants are due to splicing errors and the actual number of biologically relevant alternatively spliced genes is much lower.

== Discovery ==
Alternative splicing was first observed in 1977. The adenovirus produces five primary transcripts early in its infectious cycle, prior to viral DNA replication, and an additional one later, after DNA replication begins. The early primary transcripts continue to be produced after DNA replication begins. The additional primary transcript produced late in infection is large and comes from 5/6 of the 32kb adenovirus genome. This is much larger than any of the individual adenovirus mRNAs present in infected cells. Researchers found that the primary RNA transcript produced by adenovirus type 2 in the late phase was spliced in many different ways, resulting in mRNAs encoding different viral proteins. In addition, the primary transcript contained multiple polyadenylation sites, giving different 3' ends for the processed mRNAs.

In 1981, the first example of alternative splicing in a transcript from a normal, endogenous gene was characterized. The gene encoding the thyroid hormone calcitonin was found to be alternatively spliced in mammalian cells. The primary transcript from this gene contains 6 exons; the calcitonin mRNA contains exons 1–4, and terminates after a polyadenylation site in exon 4. Another mRNA is produced from this pre-mRNA by skipping exon 4, and includes exons 1–3, 5, and 6. It encodes a protein known as CGRP (calcitonin gene related peptide). Examples of alternative splicing in immunoglobulin gene transcripts in mammals were also observed in the early 1980s.

Since then, many other examples of biologically relevant alternative splicing have been found in eukaryotes. The "record-holder" for alternative splicing is a D. melanogaster gene called Dscam, which could potentially have 38,016 splice variants.

In 2021, it was discovered that the genome of adenovirus type 2, the adenovirus in which alternative splicing was first identified, was able to produce a much greater variety of splice variants than previously thought. By using next generation sequencing technology, researchers were able to update the human adenovirus type 2 transcriptome and document the presence of 904 splice variants produced by the virus through a complex pattern of alternative splicing. Very few of these splice variants have been shown to be functional, a point that the authors raise in their paper.

"An outstanding question is what roles the menagerie of novel RNAs play or whether they are spurious molecules generated by an overloaded splicing machinery."

== Modes ==
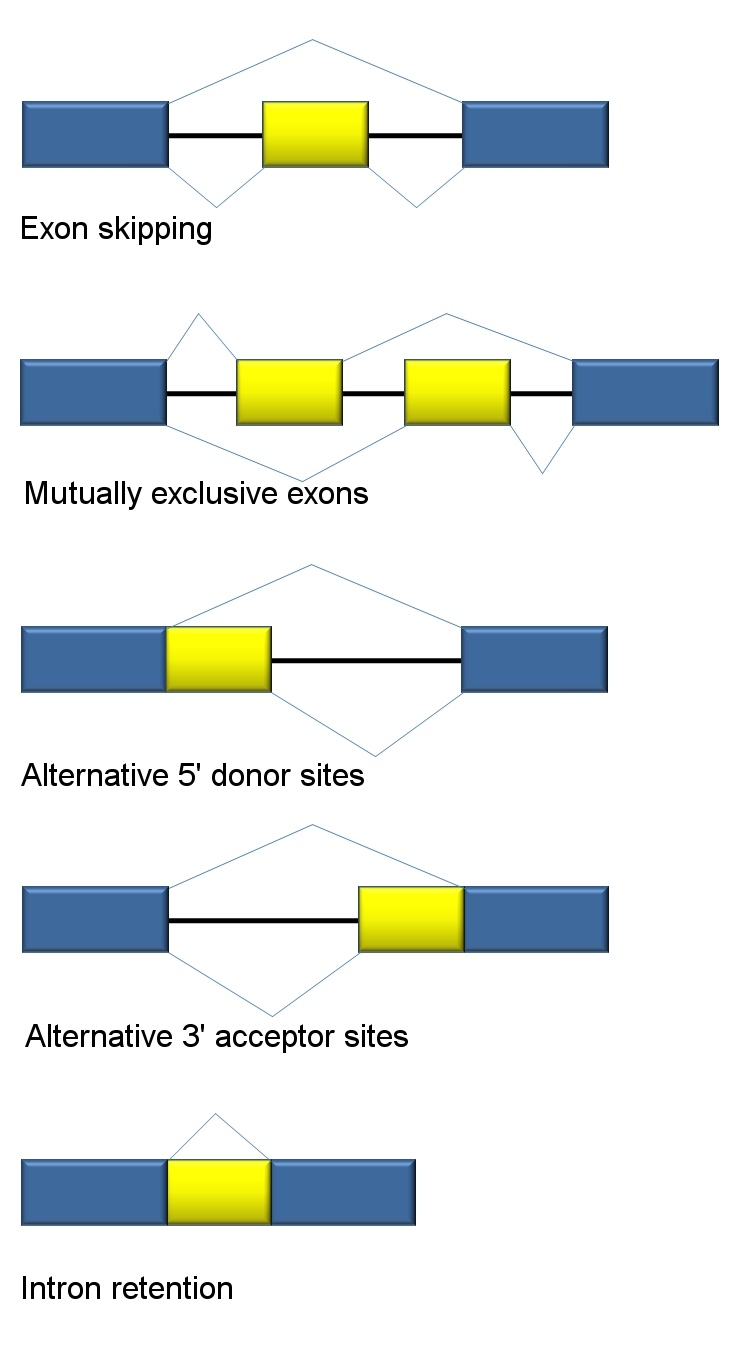
Traditional classification of basic types of alternative RNA splicing events. Exons are represented as blue and yellow blocks, introns as lines in between.

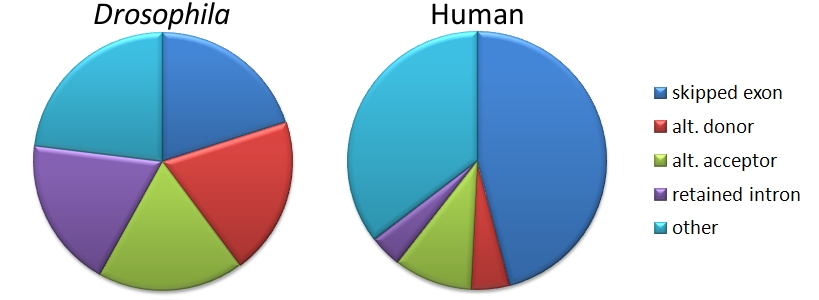
Relative frequencies of types of alternative splicing events differ between humans and fruit flies.

Five basic modes of alternative splicing are generally recognized.

- Exon skipping or cassette exon: in this case, an exon may be spliced out of the primary transcript or retained. This is the most common mode in mammalian pre-mRNAs.
- Mutually exclusive exons: One of two exons is retained in mRNAs after splicing, but not both.
- Alternative donor site: An alternative 5' splice junction (donor site) is used, changing the 3' boundary of the upstream exon.
- Alternative acceptor site: An alternative 3' splice junction (acceptor site) is used, changing the 5' boundary of the downstream exon.
- Intron retention: A sequence may be spliced out as an intron or simply retained. This is distinguished from exon skipping because the retained sequence is not flanked by introns. If the retained intron is in the coding region, the intron must encode amino acids in frame with the neighboring exons, or a stop codon or a shift in the reading frame will cause the protein to be non-functional. This is the rarest mode in mammals but the most common in plants.

In addition to these primary modes of alternative splicing, there are two other main mechanisms by which different mRNAs may be generated from the same gene; multiple promoters and multiple polyadenylation sites. Use of multiple promoters is properly described as a transcriptional regulation mechanism rather than alternative splicing; by starting transcription at different points, transcripts with different 5'-most exons can be generated. At the other end, multiple polyadenylation sites provide different 3' end points for the transcript. Both of these mechanisms are found in combination with alternative splicing and provide additional variety in mRNAs derived from a gene.

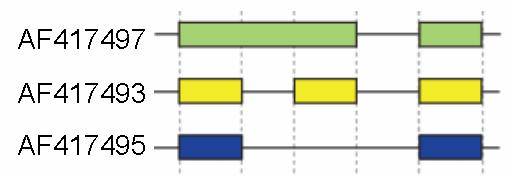
Schematic cutoff from three splicing structures in the murine hyaluronidase gene. Directionality of transcription from 5' to 3' is shown from left to right. Exons and introns are not drawn to scale.

These modes describe basic splicing mechanisms, but may be inadequate to describe complex splicing events. For instance, the figure to the right shows three spliceforms from the mouse hyaluronidase 3 gene. Comparing the exonic structure shown in the first line (green) with the one in the second line (yellow) shows intron retention, whereas the comparison between the second and the third spliceform (yellow vs. blue) exhibits exon skipping. A model nomenclature to uniquely designate all possible splicing patterns has recently been proposed.

== Mechanisms ==
=== General splicing mechanism ===
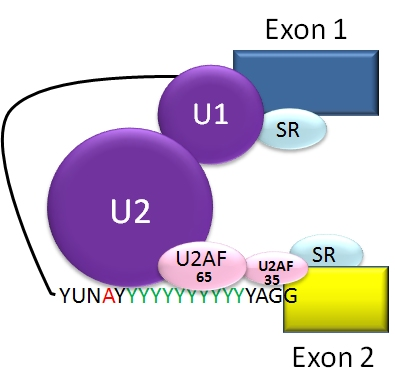
Spliceosome A complex defines the 5' and 3' ends of the intron before removal.

When the pre-mRNA has been transcribed from the DNA, it includes several introns and exons. (In nematodes, the mean is 4–5 exons and introns; in the fruit fly Drosophila there can be more than 100 introns and exons in one transcribed pre-mRNA.) The exons to be retained in the mRNA are determined during the splicing process. The regulation and selection of splice sites are done by trans-acting splicing activator and splicing repressor proteins as well as cis-acting elements within the pre-mRNA itself such as exonic splicing enhancers and exonic splicing silencers.

The typical eukaryotic nuclear intron has consensus sequences defining important regions. Each intron has the sequence GU at its 5' end. Near the 3' end there is a branch site. The nucleotide at the branchpoint is always an A; the consensus around this sequence varies somewhat. In humans the branch site consensus sequence is yUnAy. The branch site is followed by a series of pyrimidines – the polypyrimidine tract – then by AG at the 3' end.

Splicing of mRNA is performed by an RNA and protein complex known as the spliceosome, containing snRNPs designated U1, U2, U4, U5, and U6 (U3 is not involved in mRNA splicing). U1 binds to the 5' GU and U2, with the assistance of the U2AF protein factors, binds to the branchpoint A within the branch site. The complex at this stage is known as the spliceosome A complex. Formation of the A complex is usually the key step in determining the ends of the intron to be spliced out, and defining the ends of the exon to be retained. (The U nomenclature derives from their high uridine content).

The U4,U5,U6 complex binds, and U6 replaces the U1 position. U1 and U4 leave. The remaining complex then performs two transesterification reactions. In the first transesterification, 5' end of the intron is cleaved from the upstream exon and joined to the branch site A by a 2',5'-phosphodiester linkage. In the second transesterification, the 3' end of the intron is cleaved from the downstream exon, and the two exons are joined by a phosphodiester bond. The intron is then released in lariat form and degraded.

=== Regulatory elements and proteins ===
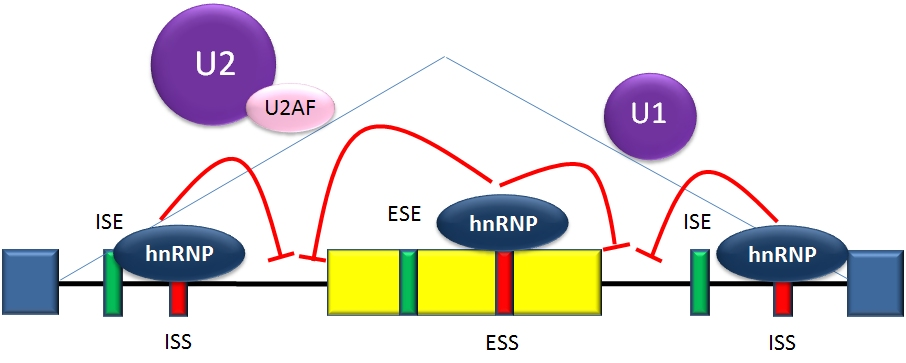
Splicing repression

Splicing is regulated by trans-acting proteins (repressors and activators) and corresponding cis-acting regulatory sites (silencers and enhancers) on the pre-mRNA. However, as part of the complexity of alternative splicing, it is noted that the effects of a splicing factor are frequently position-dependent. That is, a splicing factor that serves as a splicing activator when bound to an intronic enhancer element may serve as a repressor when bound to its splicing element in the context of an exon, and vice versa. The secondary structure of the pre-mRNA transcript also plays a role in regulating splicing, such as by bringing together splicing elements or by masking a sequence that would otherwise serve as a binding element for a splicing factor. Together, these elements form a "splicing code" that governs how splicing will occur under different cellular conditions.

There are two major types of cis-acting RNA sequence elements present in pre-mRNAs and they have corresponding trans-acting RNA-binding proteins. Splicing silencers are sites to which splicing repressor proteins bind, reducing the probability that a nearby site will be used as a splice junction. These can be located in the intron itself (intronic splicing silencers, ISS) or in a neighboring exon (exonic splicing silencers, ESS). They vary in sequence, as well as in the types of proteins that bind to them. The majority of splicing repressors are heterogeneous nuclear ribonucleoproteins (hnRNPs) such as hnRNPA1 and polypyrimidine tract-binding protein (PTB). Splicing enhancers are sites to which splicing activator proteins bind, increasing the probability that a nearby site will be used as a splice junction. These also may occur in the intron (intronic splicing enhancers, ISE) or exon (exonic splicing enhancers, ESE). Most of the activator proteins that bind to ISEs and ESEs are members of the SR protein family. Such proteins contain RNA recognition motifs and arginine and serine-rich (RS) domains.

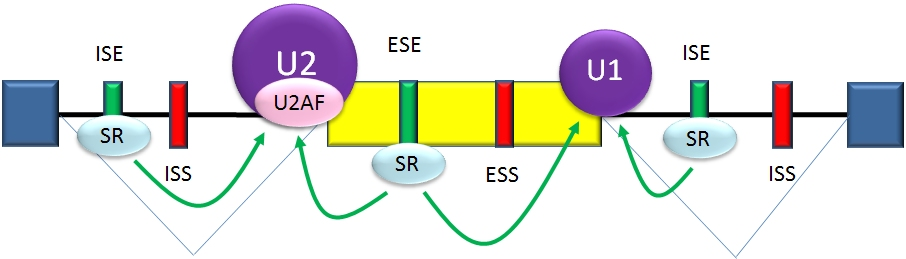
Splicing activation

In general, the determinants of splicing work in an inter-dependent manner that depends on context, so that the rules governing how splicing is regulated form a splicing code. The presence of a particular cis-acting RNA sequence element may increase the probability that a nearby site will be spliced in some cases, but decrease the probability in other cases, depending on context. The context within which regulatory elements act includes cis-acting context that is established by the presence of other RNA sequence features, and trans-acting context that is established by cellular conditions. For example, some cis-acting RNA sequence elements influence splicing only if multiple elements are present in the same region so as to establish context. As another example, a cis-acting element can have opposite effects on splicing, depending on which proteins are expressed in the cell (e.g., neuronal versus non-neuronal PTB). The adaptive significance of splicing silencers and enhancers is attested by studies showing that there is strong selection in human genes against mutations that produce new silencers or disrupt existing enhancers.

=== Examples ===
==== Exon skipping: Drosophila dsx ====
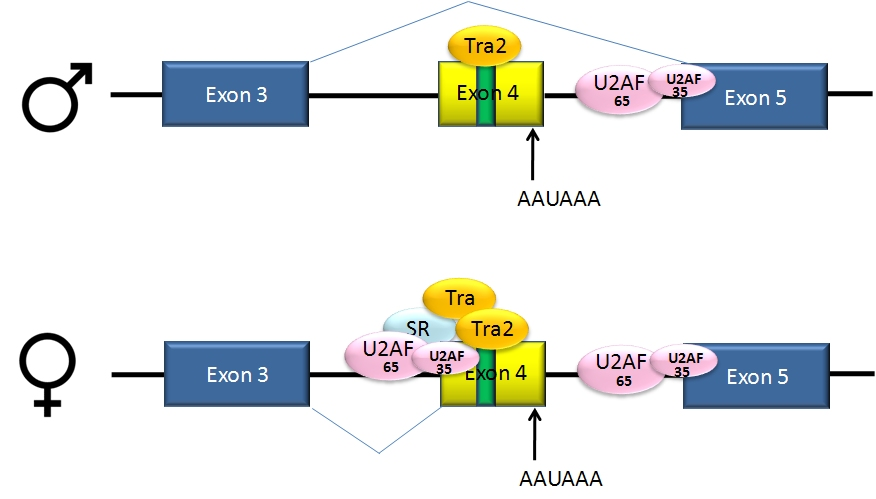
Alternative splicing of dsx pre-mRNA

Pre-mRNAs from the Drosophila melanogaster gene dsx contain 6 exons. In males, exons 1, 2, 3, 5, and 6 are joined to form the mRNA, which encodes a transcriptional regulatory protein required for male development. In females, exons 1, 2, 3, and 4 are joined, and a polyadenylation signal in exon 4 causes cleavage of the mRNA at that point. The resulting mRNA is a transcriptional regulatory protein required for female development.

This is an example of exon skipping. The intron upstream from exon 4 has a polypyrimidine tract that does not match the consensus sequence well, so that U2AF proteins bind poorly to it without assistance from splicing activators. This 3' splice acceptor site is therefore not used in males. Females, however, produce the splicing activator Transformer (Tra) (see below). The SR protein Tra2 is produced in both sexes and binds to an ESE in exon 4; if Tra is present, it binds to Tra2 and, along with another SR protein, forms a complex that assists U2AF proteins in binding to the weak polypyrimidine tract. U2 is recruited to the associated branchpoint, and this leads to inclusion of exon 4 in the mRNA.

==== Alternative acceptor sites: Drosophila Transformer ====
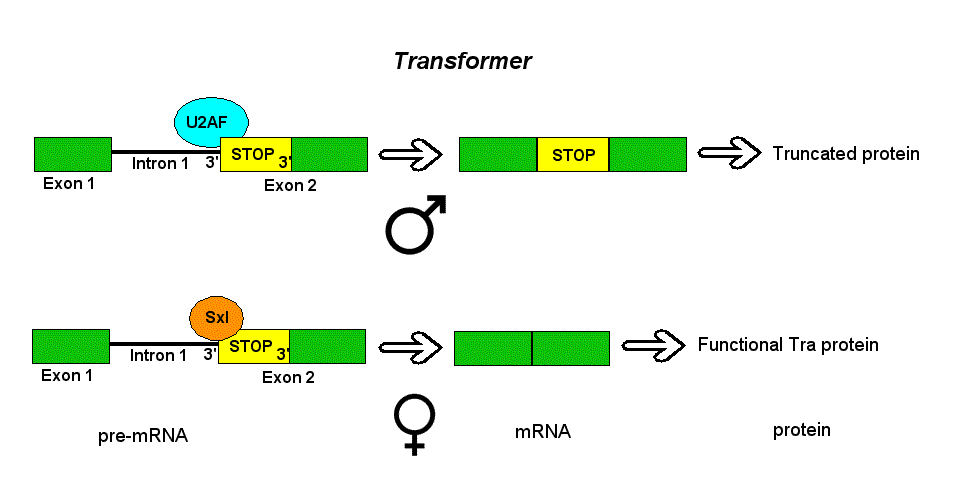
Alternative splicing of the Drosophila Transformer gene product

Pre-mRNAs of the Transformer (Tra) gene of Drosophila melanogaster undergo alternative splicing via the alternative acceptor site mode. The gene Tra encodes a protein that is expressed only in females. The primary transcript of this gene contains an intron with two possible acceptor sites. In males, the upstream acceptor site is used. This causes a longer version of exon 2 to be included in the processed transcript, including an early stop codon. The resulting mRNA encodes a truncated protein product that is inactive. Females produce the master sex determination protein Sex lethal (Sxl). The Sxl protein is a splicing repressor that binds to an ISS in the RNA of the Tra transcript near the upstream acceptor site, preventing U2AF protein from binding to the polypyrimidine tract. This prevents the use of this junction, shifting the spliceosome binding to the downstream acceptor site. Splicing at this point bypasses the stop codon, which is excised as part of the intron. The resulting mRNA encodes an active Tra protein, which itself is a regulator of alternative splicing of other sex-related genes (see dsx above).

==== Exon definition: Fas receptor ====
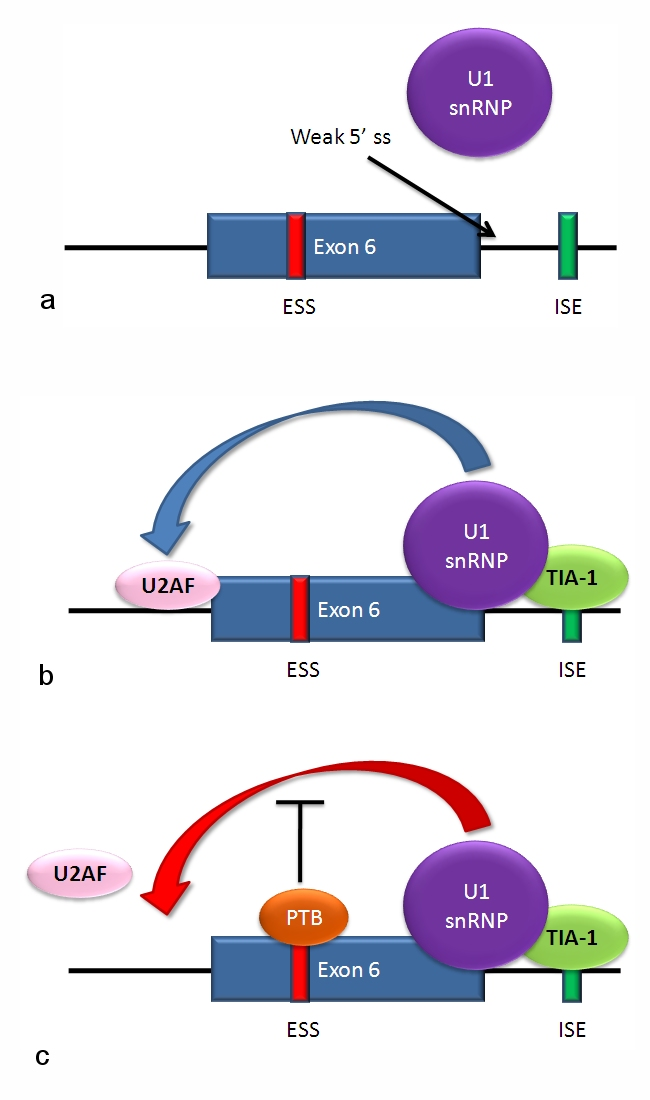
Alternative splicing of the Fas receptor pre-mRNA

Multiple isoforms of the Fas receptor protein are produced by alternative splicing. Two normally occurring isoforms in humans are produced by an exon-skipping mechanism. An mRNA including exon 6 encodes the membrane-bound form of the Fas receptor, which promotes apoptosis, or programmed cell death. Increased expression of Fas receptor in skin cells chronically exposed to the sun, and absence of expression in skin cancer cells, suggests that this mechanism may be important in elimination of pre-cancerous cells in humans. If exon 6 is skipped, the resulting mRNA encodes a soluble Fas protein that does not promote apoptosis. The inclusion or skipping of the exon depends on two antagonistic proteins, TIA-1 and polypyrimidine tract-binding protein (PTB).

- The 5' donor site in the intron downstream from exon 6 in the pre-mRNA has a weak agreement with the consensus sequence, and is not bound usually by the U1 snRNP. If U1 does not bind, the exon is skipped (see "a" in accompanying figure).
- Binding of TIA-1 protein to an intronic splicing enhancer site stabilizes binding of the U1 snRNP. The resulting 5' donor site complex assists in binding of the splicing factor U2AF to the 3' splice site upstream of the exon, through a mechanism that is not yet known (see b).
- Exon 6 contains a pyrimidine-rich exonic splicing silencer, ure6, where PTB can bind. If PTB binds, it inhibits the effect of the 5' donor complex on the binding of U2AF to the acceptor site, resulting in exon skipping (see c).

This mechanism is an example of exon definition in splicing. A spliceosome assembles on an intron, and the snRNP subunits fold the RNA so that the 5' and 3' ends of the intron are joined. However, recently studied examples such as this one show that there are also interactions between the ends of the exon. In this particular case, these exon definition interactions are necessary to allow the binding of core splicing factors prior to assembly of the spliceosomes on the two flanking introns.

==== Repressor-activator competition: HIV-1 tat exon 2 ====
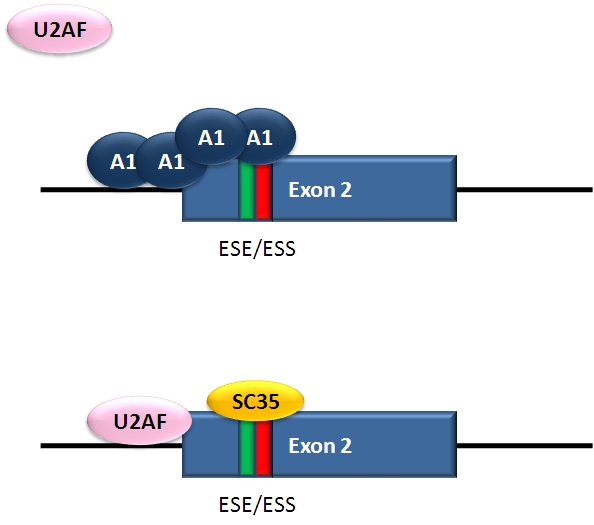
Alternative splicing of HIV-1 tat exon 2

HIV, the retrovirus that causes AIDS in humans, produces a single primary RNA transcript, which is alternatively spliced in multiple ways to produce over 40 different mRNAs. Equilibrium among differentially spliced transcripts provides multiple mRNAs encoding different products that are required for viral multiplication. One of the differentially spliced transcripts contains the tat gene, in which exon 2 is a cassette exon that may be skipped or included. The inclusion of tat exon 2 in the RNA is regulated by competition between the splicing repressor hnRNP A1 and the SR protein SC35. Within exon 2 an exonic splicing silencer sequence (ESS) and an exonic splicing enhancer sequence (ESE) overlap. If A1 repressor protein binds to the ESS, it initiates cooperative binding of multiple A1 molecules, extending into the 5' donor site upstream of exon 2 and preventing the binding of the core splicing factor U2AF35 to the polypyrimidine tract. If SC35 binds to the ESE, it prevents A1 binding and maintains the 5' donor site in an accessible state for assembly of the spliceosome. Competition between the activator and repressor ensures that both mRNA types (with and without exon 2) are produced.

== Adaptive significance ==
Genuine alternative splicing occurs in both protein-coding genes and non-coding genes to produce multiple products (proteins or non-coding RNAs). External information is needed in order to decide which product is made, given a DNA sequence and the initial transcript. Since the methods of regulation are inherited, this provides novel ways for mutations to affect gene expression.

Alternative splicing may provide evolutionary flexibility. A single point mutation may cause a given exon to be occasionally excluded or included from a transcript during splicing, allowing production of a new protein isoform without loss of the original protein. Studies have identified intrinsically disordered regions (see Intrinsically unstructured proteins) as enriched in the non-constitutive exons suggesting that protein isoforms may display functional diversity due to the alteration of functional modules within these regions. Such functional diversity achieved by isoforms is reflected by their expression patterns and can be predicted by machine learning approaches. Comparative studies indicate that alternative splicing preceded multicellularity in evolution, and suggest that this mechanism might have been co-opted to assist in the development of multicellular organisms.

Research based on the Human Genome Project and other genome sequencing has shown that humans have only about 30% more genes than the roundworm Caenorhabditis elegans, and only about twice as many as the fly Drosophila melanogaster. This finding led to speculation that the perceived greater complexity of humans, or vertebrates generally, might be due to higher rates of alternative splicing in humans than are found in invertebrates. However, a study on samples of 100,000 expressed sequence tags (EST) each from human, mouse, rat, cow, fly (D. melanogaster), worm (C. elegans), and the plant Arabidopsis thaliana found no large differences in frequency of alternatively spliced genes among humans and any of the other animals tested. Another study, however, proposed that these results were an artifact of the different numbers of ESTs available for the various organisms. When they compared alternative splicing frequencies in random subsets of genes from each organism, the authors concluded that vertebrates do have higher rates of alternative splicing than invertebrates.

== Disease ==
Changes in the RNA processing machinery may lead to mis-splicing of multiple transcripts, while single-nucleotide alterations in splice sites or cis-acting splicing regulatory sites may lead to differences in splicing of a single gene, and thus in the mRNA produced from a mutant gene's transcripts. A study in 2005 involving probabilistic analyses indicated that greater than 60% of human disease-causing mutations affect splicing rather than directly affecting coding sequences. A more recent study indicates that one-third of all hereditary diseases are likely to have a splicing component. Regardless of exact percentage, a number of splicing-related diseases do exist. As described below, a prominent example of splicing-related diseases is cancer.

Abnormally spliced mRNAs are also found in a high proportion of cancerous cells. Combined RNA-Seq and proteomics analyses have revealed striking differential expression of splice isoforms of key proteins in important cancer pathways. It is not always clear whether such aberrant patterns of splicing contribute to the cancerous growth, or are merely consequence of cellular abnormalities associated with cancer. For certain types of cancer, like in colorectal and prostate, the number of splicing errors per cancer has been shown to vary greatly between individual cancers, a phenomenon referred to as transcriptome instability. Transcriptome instability has further been shown to correlate greatly with reduced expression level of splicing factor genes. Mutation of DNMT3A has been demonstrated to contribute to hematologic malignancies, and that DNMT3A-mutated cell lines exhibit transcriptome instability as compared to their isogenic wildtype counterparts.

In fact, there is actually a reduction of alternative splicing in cancerous cells compared to normal ones, and the types of splicing differ; for instance, cancerous cells show higher levels of intron retention than normal cells, but lower levels of exon skipping. Some of the differences in splicing in cancerous cells may be due to the high frequency of somatic mutations in splicing factor genes, and some may result from changes in phosphorylation of trans-acting splicing factors. Others may be produced by changes in the relative amounts of splicing factors produced; for instance, breast cancer cells have been shown to have increased levels of the splicing factor SF2/ASF. One study found that a relatively small percentage (383 out of over 26000) of alternative splicing variants were significantly higher in frequency in tumor cells than normal cells, suggesting that there is a limited set of genes which, when mis-spliced, contribute to tumor development. It is believed however that the deleterious effects of mis-spliced transcripts are usually safeguarded and eliminated by a cellular posttranscriptional quality control mechanism termed nonsense-mediated mRNA decay [NMD].

One example of a specific splicing variant associated with cancers is in one of the human DNMT genes. Three DNMT genes encode enzymes that add methyl groups to DNA, a modification that often has regulatory effects. Several abnormally spliced DNMT3B mRNAs are found in tumors and cancer cell lines. In two separate studies, expression of two of these abnormally spliced mRNAs in mammalian cells caused changes in the DNA methylation patterns in those cells. Cells with one of the abnormal mRNAs also grew twice as fast as control cells, indicating a direct contribution to tumor development by this product.

Another example is the Ron (MST1R) proto-oncogene. An important property of cancerous cells is their ability to move and invade normal tissue. Production of an abnormally spliced transcript of Ron has been found to be associated with increased levels of the SF2/ASF in breast cancer cells. The abnormal isoform of the Ron protein encoded by this mRNA leads to cell motility.

Overexpression of a truncated splice variant of the FOSB gene – ΔFosB – in a specific population of neurons in the nucleus accumbens has been identified as the causal mechanism involved in the induction and maintenance of an addiction to drugs and natural rewards.

Recent provocative studies point to a key function of chromatin structure and histone modifications in alternative splicing regulation. These insights suggest that epigenetic regulation determines not only what parts of the genome are expressed but also how they are spliced.

== Genome-scale (transcriptome-wide) analysis ==
Transcriptome-wide analysis of alternative splicing is typically performed by high-throughput RNA-sequencing. Most commonly, by short-read sequencing, such as by Illumina instrumentation. But even more informative, by long-read sequencing, such as by Nanopore or PacBio instrumentation. Transcriptome-wide analyses can for example be used to measure the amount of deviating alternative splicing, such as in a cancer cohort.

Deep sequencing technologies have been used to conduct genome-wide analyses of both unprocessed and processed mRNAs; thus providing insights into alternative splicing. For example, results from use of deep sequencing indicate that, in humans, an estimated 95% of transcripts from multiexon genes undergo alternative splicing, with a number of pre-mRNA transcripts spliced in a tissue-specific manner. Functional genomics and computational approaches based on multiple instance learning have also been developed to integrate RNA-seq data to predict functions for alternatively spliced isoforms. Deep sequencing has also aided in the in vivo detection of the transient lariats that are released during splicing, the determination of branch site sequences, and the large-scale mapping of branchpoints in human pre-mRNA transcripts.

More historically, alternatively spliced transcripts have been found by comparing EST sequences, but this requires sequencing of very large numbers of ESTs. Most EST libraries come from a very limited number of tissues, so tissue-specific splice variants are likely to be missed in any case. High-throughput approaches to investigate splicing have, however, been developed, such as: DNA microarray–based analyses, RNA-binding assays, and deep sequencing. These methods can be used to screen for polymorphisms or mutations in or around splicing elements that affect protein binding. When combined with splicing assays, including in vivo reporter gene assays, the functional effects of polymorphisms or mutations on the splicing of pre-mRNA transcripts can then be analyzed.

In microarray analysis, arrays of DNA fragments representing individual exons (e.g. Affymetrix exon microarray) or exon/exon boundaries (e.g. arrays from ExonHit or Jivan) have been used. The array is then probed with labeled cDNA from tissues of interest. The probe cDNAs bind to DNA from the exons that are included in mRNAs in their tissue of origin, or to DNA from the boundary where two exons have been joined. This can reveal the presence of particular alternatively spliced mRNAs.

CLIP (Cross-linking and immunoprecipitation) uses UV radiation to link proteins to RNA molecules in a tissue during splicing. A trans-acting splicing regulatory protein of interest is then precipitated using specific antibodies. When the RNA attached to that protein is isolated and cloned, it reveals the target sequences for that protein. Another method for identifying RNA-binding proteins and mapping their binding to pre-mRNA transcripts is "Microarray Evaluation of Genomic Aptamers by shift (MEGAshift)".net This method involves an adaptation of the "Systematic Evolution of Ligands by Exponential Enrichment (SELEX)" method together with a microarray-based readout. Use of the MEGAshift method has provided insights into the regulation of alternative splicing by allowing for the identification of sequences in pre-mRNA transcripts surrounding alternatively spliced exons that mediate binding to different splicing factors, such as ASF/SF2 and PTB. This approach has also been used to aid in determining the relationship between RNA secondary structure and the binding of splicing factors.

Use of reporter assays makes it possible to find the splicing proteins involved in a specific alternative splicing event by constructing reporter genes that will express one of two different fluorescent proteins depending on the splicing reaction that occurs. This method has been used to isolate mutants affecting splicing and thus to identify novel splicing regulatory proteins inactivated in those mutants.

Recent advancements in protein structure prediction have facilitated the development of new tools for genome annotation and alternative splicing analysis. For instance, isoform.io, a platform guided by protein structure predictions, has evaluated hundreds of thousands of isoforms of human protein-coding genes assembled from numerous RNA sequencing experiments across a variety of human tissues. This comprehensive analysis has led to the identification of numerous isoforms with more confidently predicted structure and potentially superior function compared to canonical isoforms in the latest human gene database. By integrating structural predictions with expression and evolutionary evidence, this approach has demonstrated the potential of protein structure prediction as a tool for refining the annotation of the human genome.

== Databases ==
There is a collection of alternative splicing databases. These databases are useful for finding genes having pre-mRNAs undergoing alternative splicing and alternative splicing events or to study the functional impact of alternative splicing.

- AspicDB database
- Intronerator database
- ProSAS database

== See also ==
- Exitron
- Polyadenylation § Alternative polyadenylation
- Trans-splicing
