= Apolipoprotein B =

Protein found in humans

APOB

Identifiers
- Aliases: APOB, FLDB, LDLCQ4, apoB-100, apoB-48, apolipoprotein B, FCHL2
- External IDs: OMIM: 107730; MGI: 88052; GeneCards: APOB

Gene location (Human)
Chr.	Chromosome 2 (human)
Band	2p24.1	Start	21,001,429 bp
Band	2p24.1	End	21,044,073 bp

Gene location (Mouse)
Chr.	Chromosome 12 (mouse)
Band	12 A1.1|12 3.53 cM	Start	8,027,648 bp
Band	12 A1.1|12 3.53 cM	End	8,066,835 bp
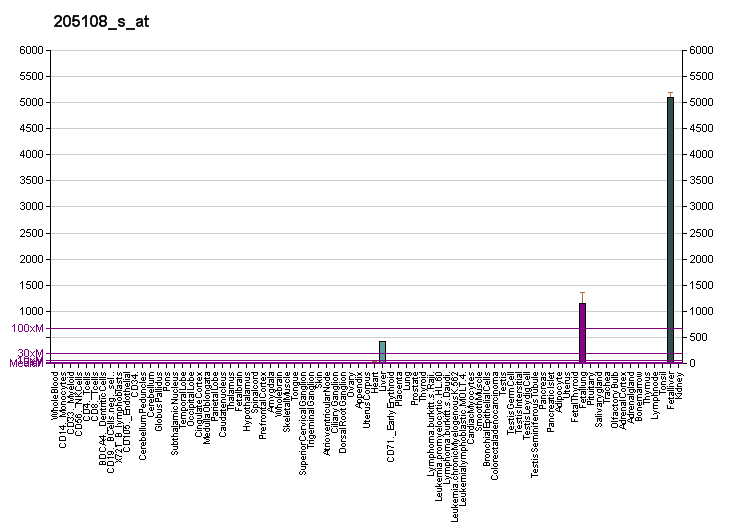
RNA expression pattern
Bgee	Human / Mouse (ortholog); Top expressed in: jejunal mucosa; liver; mucosa of ileum; right lobe of liver; duodenum; right ventricle; right auricle of heart; myocardium; left ventricle; cardiac muscle tissue of right atrium / Top expressed in: left lobe of liver; jejunum; yolk sac; duodenum; ileum; gallbladder; primitive streak; intestinal epithelium; intestinal villus; migratory enteric neural crest cell; More reference expression data
BioGPS	More reference expression data
Gene ontology
Molecular function	protein binding; lipid binding; lipid transporter activity; cholesterol transfer activity; lipase binding; low-density lipoprotein particle receptor binding; phospholipid binding; heparin binding; signaling receptor binding
Cellular component	early endosome; chylomicron remnant; vesicle lumen; endoplasmic reticulum; endosome membrane; mature chylomicron; endoplasmic reticulum lumen; vesicle membrane; endosome lumen; intermediate-density lipoprotein particle; clathrin-coated endocytic vesicle membrane; endoplasmic reticulum membrane; extracellular exosome; endocytic vesicle lumen; soma; cytoplasm; chylomicron; very-low-density lipoprotein particle; low-density lipoprotein particle; endoplasmic reticulum exit site; extracellular space; smooth endoplasmic reticulum; cytosol; plasma membrane; lysosomal lumen; intracellular membrane-bounded organelle; extracellular region; high-density lipoprotein particle
Biological process	artery morphogenesis; in utero embryonic development; fertilization; receptor-mediated endocytosis; positive regulation of cholesterol storage; lipid metabolism; cholesterol metabolic process; cholesterol transport; regulation of cholesterol biosynthetic process; lipid transport; nervous system development; leukocyte migration; response to carbohydrate; retinoid metabolic process; steroid metabolic process; triglyceride mobilization; lipid catabolic process; response to lipopolysaccharide; positive regulation of macrophage derived foam cell differentiation; cellular response to prostaglandin stimulus; response to virus; positive regulation of lipid storage; cellular response to tumor necrosis factor; response to selenium ion; flagellated sperm motility; positive regulation of gene expression; response to organic substance; cholesterol homeostasis; spermatogenesis; triglyceride catabolic process; cholesterol efflux; post-embryonic development; lipoprotein transport; toll-like receptor signaling pathway; response to estradiol; membrane organization; chylomicron remodeling; low-density lipoprotein particle remodeling; chylomicron assembly; very-low-density lipoprotein particle assembly; chylomicron remnant clearance; low-density lipoprotein particle clearance; very-low-density lipoprotein particle clearance; lipoprotein metabolic process; lipoprotein biosynthetic process; lipoprotein catabolic process; post-translational protein modification; transport
Sources:Amigo / QuickGO
Orthologs
Databases	NCBI: entry; OMA: entry
Species	Human	Mouse
Entrez	338	238055
Ensembl	ENSG00000084674	ENSMUSG00000020609
UniProt	P04114	E9Q414
RefSeq (mRNA)	NM_000384	NM_009693
RefSeq (protein)	NP_000375	NP_033823
Location (UCSC)	Chr 2: 21 – 21.04 Mb	Chr 12: 8.03 – 8.07 Mb
PubMed search
- Wikidata
View/Edit Human	View/Edit Mouse

Apolipoprotein B (ApoB) is a protein that in humans is encoded by the APOB gene. Its measurement is commonly used to detect the risk of atherosclerotic cardiovascular disease.

== Isoforms ==
The protein occurs in the plasma in two main isoforms, ApoB48 and ApoB100. The first is synthesized exclusively by the small intestine, the second by the liver. ApoB-100 is the largest of the apoB group of proteins, consisting of 4563 amino acids, including a 27-amino acid signal peptide and a 4536-amino acid mature protein. Both isoforms are coded by APOB and by a single mRNA transcript larger than 16 kb. ApoB48 is generated when a stop codon (UAA) at residue 2153 is created by RNA editing. There appears to be a trans-acting tissue-specific splicing gene that determines which isoform is ultimately produced. Alternatively, there is some evidence that a cis-acting element several thousand bp upstream determines which isoform is produced.

As a result of the RNA editing, ApoB48 and ApoB100 share a common N-terminal sequence, but ApoB48 lacks ApoB100's C-terminal LDL receptor binding region. ApoB48 is named because it constitutes 48% of the sequence for ApoB100. ApoB48 is a unique protein in chylomicrons from the small intestine. After most of the lipids in the chylomicron have been absorbed, ApoB48 returns to the liver as part of the chylomicron remnant, where it is endocytosed and degraded.

== Function ==
Apolipoprotein B is the primary apolipoprotein of chylomicrons, VLDL, Lp(a), IDL, and LDL particles (LDL—commonly known as "bad cholesterol" when in reference to both heart disease and vascular disease in general), which is responsible for carrying fat molecules (lipids), including cholesterol, around the body to all cells within all tissues. While all the functional roles of ApoB within the LDL (and all larger) particles remain somewhat unclear, it is the primary organizing protein (of the entire complex shell enclosing/carrying fat molecules within) component of the particles and is absolutely required for the formation of these particles. What is also clear is that the ApoB on the LDL particle acts as a ligand for LDL receptors in various cells throughout the body (i.e., less formally, ApoB indicates fat-carrying particles are ready to enter any cells with ApoB receptors and deliver fats carried within into the cells).

=== Role in innate immune system ===
Very low-density lipoproteins and low-density lipoproteins interfere with the quorum sensing system that upregulates genes required for invasive Staphylococcus aureus infection. The mechanism of antagonism entails binding ApoB to a S. aureus autoinducer pheromone, preventing signaling through its receptor. Mice deficient in ApoB are more susceptible to invasive bacterial infection.

== Clinical significance ==
There is considerable evidence that concentrations of ApoB and especially the NMR assay (specific for LDL-particle concentrations) are superior indicators of vascular/heart disease driving physiology than either total cholesterol or LDL-cholesterol (as long promoted by the NIH starting in the early 1970s). However, primarily for historic cost/complexity reasons, cholesterol, and estimated LDL-cholesterol by calculation, remains the most commonly promoted lipid test for the risk factor of atherosclerosis. ApoB is routinely measured using immunoassays such as ELISA or nephelometry. Refined and automated NMR methods allow measurement distinctions between the many different ApoB particles.

=== Genetic disorders ===
High levels of ApoB are related to heart disease. Hypobetalipoproteinemia is a genetic disorder that can be caused by a mutation in the ApoB gene, APOB. Abetalipoproteinaemia is caused by a mutation in the microsomal triglyceride transfer protein gene, MTTP.

Mutations in gene APOB100 can also cause familial hypercholesterolemia, a hereditary (autosomal dominant) form of metabolic disorder hypercholesterolemia.

=== Role in insulin resistance ===
Overproduction of apolipoprotein B can result in lipid-induced endoplasmic reticulum stress and insulin resistance in the liver.

=== Role in lipoproteins and atherosclerosis ===
ApoB100 is found in lipoproteins originating from the liver (VLDL, IDL, LDL). Importantly, there is one ApoB100 molecule per hepatic-derived lipoprotein. Hence, using that fact, one can quantify the number of lipoprotein particles by noting the total ApoB100 concentration in the circulation. Since there is one and only one ApoB100 per particle, the number of particles is reflected by the ApoB100 concentration. The same technique can be applied to individual lipoprotein classes (e.g., LDL) and thereby enable one to count them as well.

It is well established that ApoB100 levels are associated with coronary heart disease, they are a far better predictor of it than are LDL-C concentrations. Reason: LDL-C does not reflect actual particle concentrations and cholesterol cannot dissolve or move (in water) without particles to carry it. A simple way to understand this observation is the fact that ApoB100, one per particle, reflects actual lipoprotein particle concentration (independent of their cholesterol or other lipid content). In this way, one can understand that the number of ApoB100-containing lipoprotein particles which can carry lipids into the artery walls is a key determinant, driver of atherosclerosis and heart disease.

One way to explain the above is to consider that large numbers of lipoprotein particles, and, in particular, large numbers of LDL particles, lead to competition at the ApoB100 receptor (i.e., LDL receptor) of peripheral cells. Since such competition will prolong the residence time of LDL particles in the circulation, it may lead to greater opportunity for them to undergo oxidation and/or other chemical modifications. Such modifications may lessen the particles' ability to be cleared by the classic LDL receptor and/or increase their ability to interact with so-called "scavenger" receptors. The net result is the shunting of LDL particles to these scavenger receptors. Scavenger receptors are typically found on macrophages, with cholesterol-laden macrophages being better known as "foam cells". Foam cells characterize atherosclerotic lesions. In addition to this possible mechanism of foam cell generation, an increase in the levels of chemically modified LDL particles may also lead to an increase in endothelial damage. This occurs as a result of modified-LDL's toxic effect on vascular endothelium as well as its ability both to recruit immune effector cells and to promote platelet activation.

The INTERHEART study found that the ApoB100 / ApoA1 ratio is more effective at predicting heart attack risk in patients who had had an acute myocardial infarction than either the ApoB100 or ApoA1 measure alone. (ApoA1 is the major HDL protein.) In the general population this remains unclear although in a recent study ApoB was the strongest risk marker for cardiovascular events.

A Mediterranean diet is recommended as a means of lowering Apolipoprotein B.

== Mouse studies ==
Mice have been used as model organisms in ApoB study as they express an equivalent protein known as mouse ApoB (mApoB). Mice overexpressing mApoB have increased levels of LDL and decreased levels of HDL. Mice containing only one functional copy of the mApoB gene show the opposite effect, being resistant to hypercholesterolemia. Mice containing no functional copies of the gene are not viable.

== Interactions ==
ApoB has been shown to interact with apo(a), PPIB, Calcitonin receptor and HSP90B1. Interaction of ApoB with proteoglycans, collagen, and fibronectin is believed to cause atherosclerosis.

== Interactive pathway map ==
Click on genes, proteins and metabolites below to link to respective articles. (Note: The interactive pathway map can be edited at WikiPathways: "Statin_Pathway_WP430".)

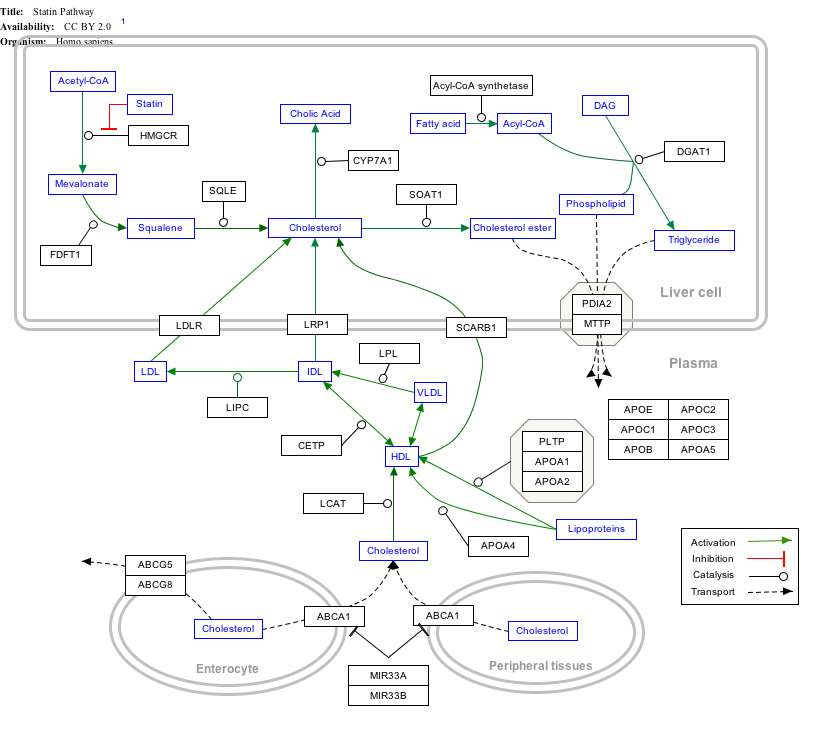

Statin pathway edit

== Regulation ==
The expression of APOB is regulated by cis-regulatory elements in the APOB 5′ UTR and 3′ UTR.

== RNA editing ==
The mRNA encoding this protein is subject to cytidine to uridine (C to U) site-specific RNA editing. ApoB100 and ApoB48 are encoded by the same gene, however, the differences in the translated proteins are not due to alternative splicing but are due to the tissue-specific RNA editing event. ApoB mRNA editing was the first example of editing observed in vertebrates. Editing of ApoB mRNA occurs in all placental mammals. Editing occurs post transcriptionally as the nascent polynucleotides do not contain edited nucleosides.

=== Type ===
C to U editing of ApoB mRNA requires an editing complex or holoenzyme (editosome) consisting of the C to U-editing enzyme Apolipoprotein B mRNA editing enzyme, catalytic polypeptide 1 (ApoBEC-1) as well as other auxiliary factors. ApoBEC-1 is a protein that in humans is encoded by the APOBEC1 gene. It is a member of the cytidine deaminase family. ApoBEC-1 alone is not sufficient for the editing of ApoB mRNA and requires at least one of these auxiliary factors, APOBEC1 complementation factor (A1CF) for editing to occur. A1CF contains 3 non-identical repeats. It acts as the RNA-binding subunit and directs ApoBEC-1 to the ApoB mRNA downstream of the edited cytidine. Other auxiliary factors are known to be part of the holoenzyme. Some of these proteins have been identified, these are CUG binding protein 2 (CUGBP2), SYNCRIP (glycine-arginine-tyrosine-rich RNA binding protein, GRY-RBP), heterogeneous nuclear ribonucleoprotein (hnRNP)-C1 (HNRNPC), ApoBEC-1 binding protein ABBP1 (HNRNPAB), ABBP2, KH-type splicing regulatory binding protein (KHSRP), Bcl-2-associated athanogene 4 (BAG4), and auxiliary factor (AUX)240. All these proteins have been identified using detection assays and have all been demonstrated to interact with either ApoBEC-1, A1CF, or ApoB RNA. The function of these auxiliary proteins in the editing complex is unknown. As well as editing ApoB mRNA, the ApoBEC-1 editsome also edits the mRNA of NF1. mRNA editing of ApoB mRNA is the best-defined example of this type of C to U RNA editing in humans.

=== Location ===
Despite being a 14,000-residue-long transcript, a single cytidine is targeted for editing. Within the ApoB mRNA, a sequence consisting of 26 nucleotides necessary for editing is found. This is known as the editing motif. These nucleotides (6662–6687) were determined to be essential by site-specific mutagenesis experiments. An 11 nucleotide portion of this sequence 4–5 nucleotides downstream from the editing site is an important region known as the mooring sequence. A region called the spacer element is found 2–8 nucleotides between the edited nucleoside and this mooring sequence. There is also a regulatory sequence 3′ to the editing site. The active site of ApoBEC-1, the catalytic component of the editing holoenzyme, is thought to bind to an AU-rich region of the mooring sequence with the aid of ACF in binding the complex to the mRNA. The edited cytidine residue is located at nucleotide 6666 located in exon 26 of the gene. Editing at this site results in a codon change from a Glutamine codon (CAA) to an in-frame stop codon (UAA). Computer modelling has detected that for editing to occur, the edited Cytidine is located in a loop. The selection of the edited cytidine is also highly dependent on this secondary structure of the surrounding RNA. There are also some indications that this loop region is formed between the mooring sequence and the 3′ regulatory region of the ApoB mRNA. The predicted secondary structure formed by ApoB mRNA is thought to allow for contact between the residue to be edited and the active site of APOBEC1, as well as for binding of ACF and other auxiliary factors associated with the editosome.

=== Regulation ===
Editing of ApoB mRNA in humans is tissue-regulated, with ApoB48 being the main ApoB protein of the small intestine in humans. It occurs in lesser amounts in the colon, kidney, and stomach, along with the non-edited version. Editing is also developmentally regulated, with the non-edited version only being translated early in development, but the edited form increases during development in the tissues where editing can occur. Editing levels of ApoB mRNA have been shown to vary in response to changes in diet, exposure to alcohol and hormone levels.

=== Conservation ===
ApoB mRNA editing also occurs in mice and rats. In contrast to humans editing occurs in liver in mice and rats up to a frequency of 65%. It has not been observed in birds or lesser species.

=== Consequences ===
==== Structure ====
Editing results in a codon change creating an in-frame stop codon, leading to translation of a truncated protein, ApoB48. This stop codon results in the translation of a protein that lacks the carboxyl terminus, which contains the protein's LDLR binding domain. The full protein ApoB100, which has nearly 4500 amino acids, is present in VLDL and LDL. Since many parts of ApoB100 are in an amphipathic condition, the structure of some of its domains is dependent on underlying lipid conditions. However, it is known to have the same overall folding as LDL, having five main domains. Recently the first structure of LDL at human body temperature in native condition has been found using cryo-electron microscopy at a resolution of 16 Angstrom. The overall folding of ApoB-100 has been confirmed, and some heterogeneity in the local structure of its domains has been mapped.

==== Function ====
Editing is restricted to those transcripts expressed in the small intestine. This shorter version of the protein has a function specific to the small intestine. The main function of the full-length liver expressed ApoB100 is as a ligand for activation of the LDL-R. However, editing results in a protein lacking this LDL-R binding region of the protein. This alters the function of the protein and the shorter ApoB48 protein, as specific functions relative to the small intestine. ApoB48 is identical to the amino-terminal 48% of ApoB100. The function of this isoform is in fat absorption of the small intestine and is involved in the synthesis, assembly and secretion of chylomicrons. These chylomicrons transport dietary lipids to tissues, while the remaining chylomicrons, along with associated residual lipids, are in 2–3 hours taken up by the liver via the interaction of apolipoprotein E (ApoE) with lipoprotein receptors. It is the dominant ApoB protein in the small intestine of most mammals. It is a key protein in the exogenous pathway of lipoprotein metabolism. Intestinal proteins containing ApoB48 are metabolized to chylomicron remnant particles, which are taken up by remnant receptors.

== See also ==
- Apolipoprotein A1
- ACAT2
- Cardiovascular disease
- Lipid metabolism
