= HNRPH1 =

Protein-coding gene in the species Homo sapiens

HNRNPH1

Identifiers
- Aliases: HNRNPH1, HNRPH, HNRPH1, hnRNPH, heterogeneous nuclear ribonucleoprotein H1 (H), heterogeneous nuclear ribonucleoprotein H1
- External IDs: OMIM: 601035; MGI: 1891925; GeneCards: HNRNPH1
Available structures
PDB	Ortholog search: PDBe RCSB
PDB	List of PDB id codes 2LXU

Gene location (Human)
Chr.	Chromosome 5 (human)
Band	5q35.3	Start	179,614,178 bp
Band	5q35.3	End	179,634,784 bp

Gene location (Mouse)
Chr.	Chromosome 11 (mouse)
Band	11|11 B1.3	Start	50,376,990 bp
Band	11|11 B1.3	End	50,386,528 bp
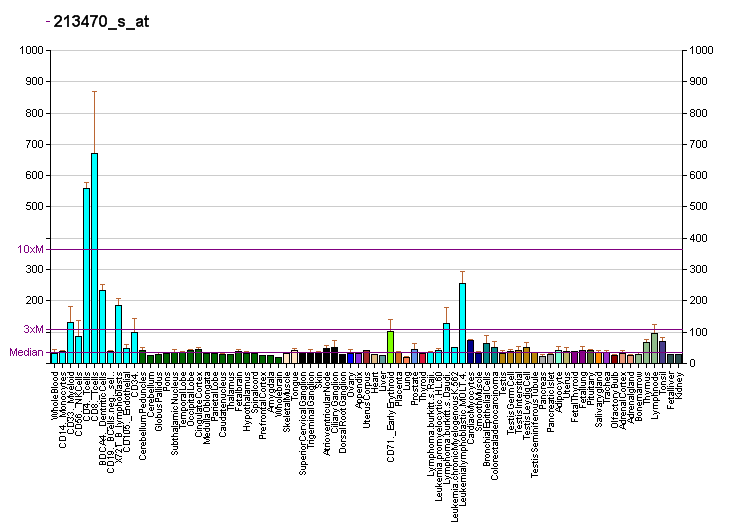

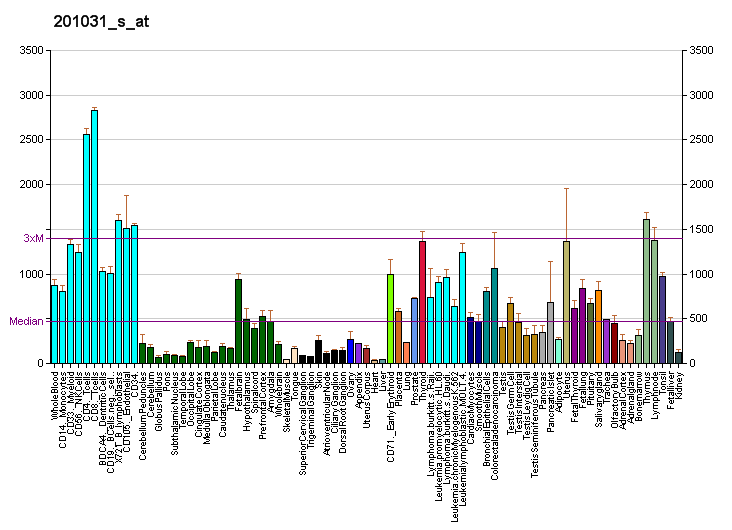
RNA expression pattern
Bgee	Human / Mouse (ortholog); Top expressed in: right lobe of thyroid gland; left lobe of thyroid gland; right uterine tube; left ovary; right ovary; Achilles tendon; body of pancreas; right lung; ganglionic eminence; ventricular zone / Top expressed in: tail of embryo; superior cervical ganglion; hand; abdominal wall; mandibular prominence; maxillary prominence; genital tubercle; primitive streak; Gonadal ridge; dermis; More reference expression data
BioGPS	More reference expression data
Gene ontology
Molecular function	nucleic acid binding; protein binding; RNA binding; poly(U) RNA binding
Cellular component	catalytic step 2 spliceosome; spliceosomal complex; membrane; nucleoplasm; cytosol; nucleus
Biological process	mRNA splicing, via spliceosome; regulation of RNA splicing; mRNA processing; RNA processing; RNA splicing; fibroblast growth factor receptor signaling pathway; RNA metabolic process
Sources:Amigo / QuickGO
Orthologs
Databases	NCBI: entry; OMA: entry
Species	Human	Mouse
Entrez	3187	59013
Ensembl	ENSG00000169045	ENSMUSG00000007850
UniProt	P31943	O35737
RefSeq (mRNA)	NM_001257293; NM_005520; NM_001363572	NM_021510; NM_001347487
RefSeq (protein)	NP_001244222; NP_005511; NP_001350501; NP_001351154; NP_001351155 NP_001351156; NP_001351157; NP_001351158; NP_001351159; NP_001351160; NP_001351161; NP_001351162; NP_001351163; NP_001351164; NP_001351165; NP_001351166; NP_001351167; NP_001351168; NP_001351169; NP_001351170; NP_001351171; NP_001351172; NP_001351173; NP_001351174; NP_001351175; NP_001351176; NP_001351177; NP_001351179; NP_001351180; NP_001351181; NP_001351182; NP_001351183; NP_001351184	NP_001334416; NP_067485; NP_001349451; NP_001349452; NP_001349453 NP_001349454; NP_001349455; NP_001349456; NP_001349457; NP_001349458; NP_001349459; NP_001349461; NP_001349462; NP_001349463
Location (UCSC)	Chr 5: 179.61 – 179.63 Mb	Chr 11: 50.38 – 50.39 Mb
PubMed search
- Wikidata
View/Edit Human	View/Edit Mouse

Heterogeneous nuclear ribonucleoprotein H is a protein that in humans is encoded by the HNRNPH1 gene.

This gene belongs to the subfamily of ubiquitously expressed heterogeneous nuclear ribonucleoproteins (hnRNPs). The hnRNPs are RNA binding proteins and they complex with heterogeneous nuclear RNA (hnRNA). These proteins are associated with pre-mRNAs in the nucleus and appear to influence pre-mRNA processing and other aspects of mRNA metabolism and transport. While all of the hnRNPs are present in the nucleus, some seem to shuttle between the nucleus and the cytoplasm. The hnRNP proteins have distinct nucleic acid binding properties; The protein encoded by this gene has three repeats of quasi-RRM domains that bind to RNAs, making it very similar to the family member HNRPF in that regard. This gene is thought to be potentially involved in hereditary lymphedema type I phenotype.
