= A1CF =

Protein-coding gene in the species Homo sapiens

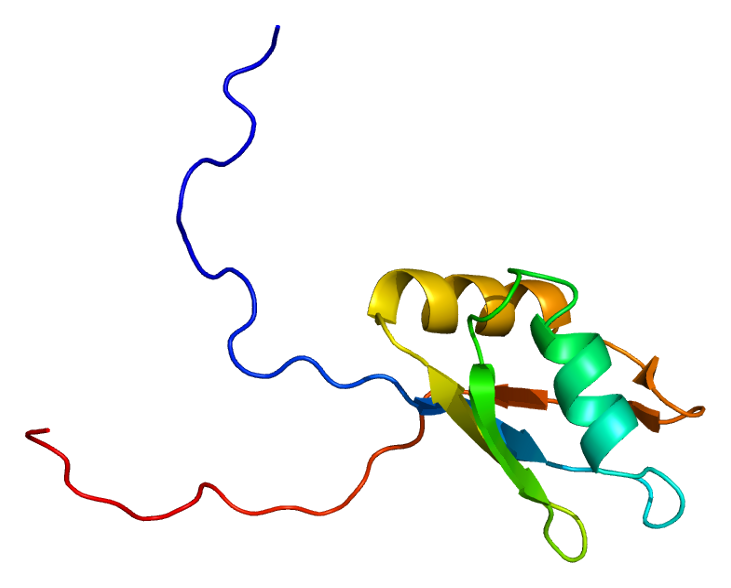

Identifiers
- Aliases: A1CF, ACF, ACF64, ACF65, APOBEC1CF, ASP, APOBEC1 complementation factor
- External IDs: OMIM: 618199; MGI: 1917115; GeneCards: A1CF
Available structures
PDB	Ortholog search: PDBe RCSB
PDB	List of PDB id codes 2CPD

Gene location (Human)
Chr.	Chromosome 10 (human)
Band	10q11.23	Start	50,799,409 bp
Band	10q11.23	End	50,885,675 bp

Gene location (Mouse)
Chr.	Chromosome 19 (mouse)
Band	19|19 C1	Start	31,846,164 bp
Band	19|19 C1	End	31,926,395 bp
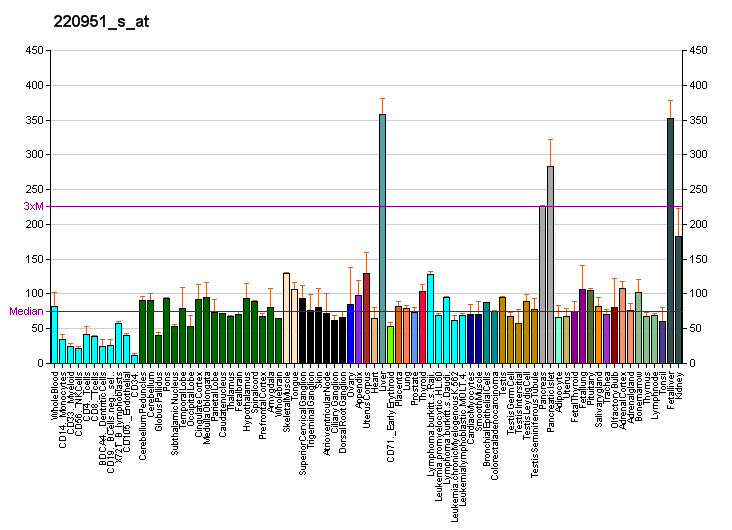
RNA expression pattern
Bgee	Human / Mouse (ortholog); Top expressed in: liver; jejunal mucosa; mucosa of ileum; right lobe of liver; buccal mucosa cell; duodenum; mucosa of colon; mucosa of sigmoid colon; oocyte; pancreatic ductal cell / Top expressed in: right kidney; proximal tubule; embryo; yolk sac; liver; duodenum; left lobe of liver; lumbar subsegment of spinal cord; jejunum; human kidney; More reference expression data
BioGPS	More reference expression data
Gene ontology
Molecular function	nucleic acid binding; double-stranded RNA binding; protein binding; single-stranded RNA binding; RNA binding; mRNA binding
Cellular component	cytoplasm; apolipoprotein B mRNA editing enzyme complex; endoplasmic reticulum; nucleus; nucleoplasm
Biological process	mRNA processing; protein stabilization; cytidine to uridine editing; mRNA modification; mRNA localization resulting in posttranscriptional regulation of gene expression
Sources:Amigo / QuickGO
Orthologs
Databases	NCBI: entry; OMA: entry
Species	Human	Mouse
Entrez	29974	69865
Ensembl	ENSG00000148584	ENSMUSG00000052595
UniProt	Q9NQ94	Q5YD48
RefSeq (mRNA)	NM_001198818; NM_001198819; NM_001198820; NM_014576; NM_138932 NM_138933; NM_001370130; NM_001370131	NM_001081074; NM_001365078
RefSeq (protein)	NP_001185747; NP_001185748; NP_001185749; NP_055391; NP_620310 NP_620311; NP_001357059; NP_001357060	NP_001074543; NP_001352007
Location (UCSC)	Chr 10: 50.8 – 50.89 Mb	Chr 19: 31.85 – 31.93 Mb
PubMed search
- Wikidata
View/Edit Human	View/Edit Mouse

APOBEC1 complementation factor is a protein that in humans is encoded by the A1CF gene.

== Gene ==
Alternative splicing occurs at this locus and three full-length transcript variants, encoding three distinct isoforms, have been described. Additional splicing has been observed but the full-length nature of these variants has not been determined.

== Function ==
Mammalian apolipoprotein B mRNA undergoes site-specific C to U deamination, which is mediated by a multi-component enzyme complex containing a minimal core composed of APOBEC1 and a complementation factor encoded by this gene. The gene product has three non-identical RNA recognition motifs and belongs to the hnRNP R family of RNA-binding proteins. It has been proposed that this complementation factor functions as an RNA-binding subunit and docks APOBEC1 to deaminate the upstream cytidine. Studies suggest that the protein may also be involved in other RNA editing or RNA processing events.

Its deletion results in lethality in mice.

== Interactions ==
A1CF has been shown to interact with APOBEC1, CUGBP2, and SYNCRIP.
