= Protein corona =

Nanoparticle technology

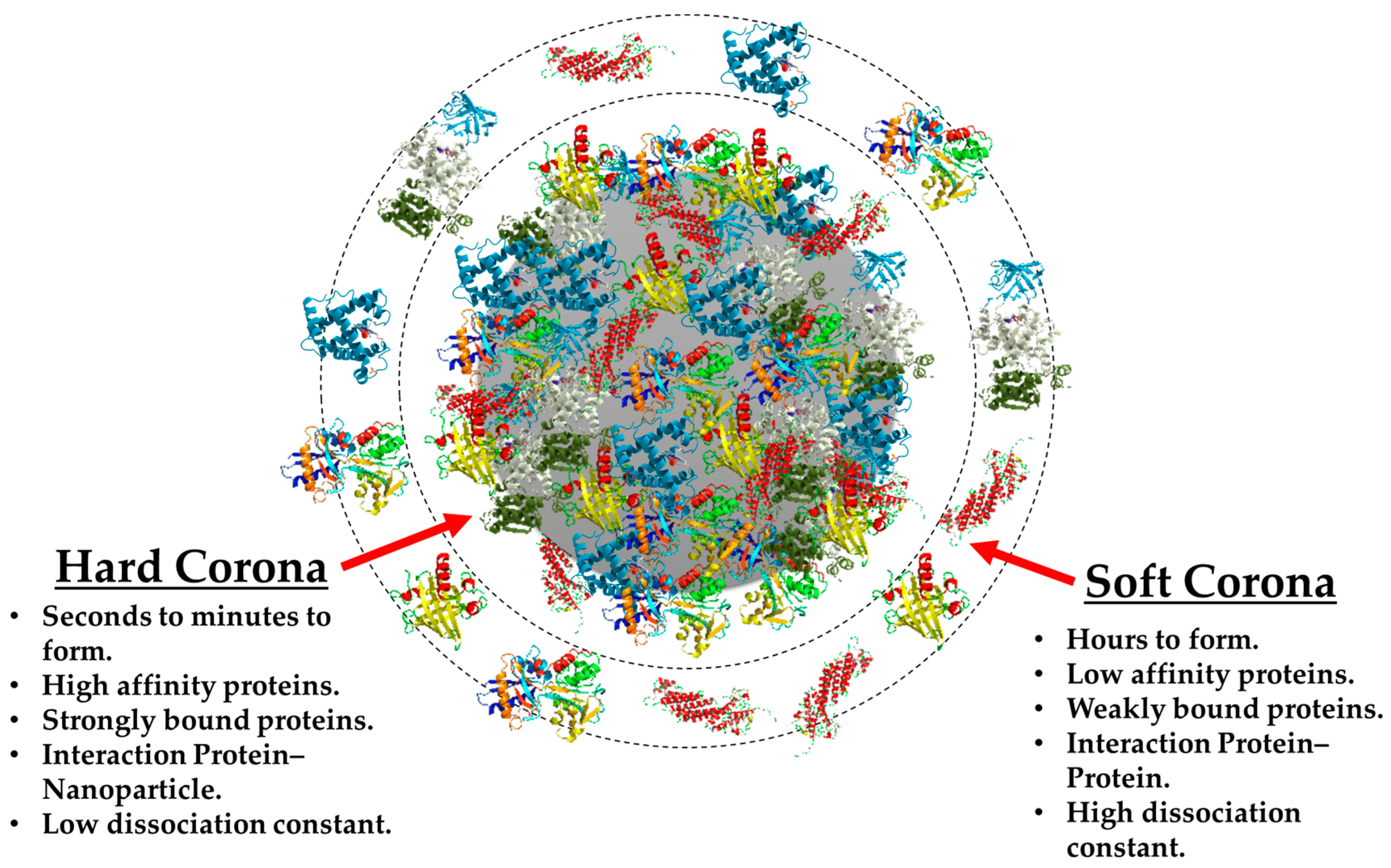
Schematic comparison of the main differences between a "hard" corona and a "soft" corona.

A protein corona is a dynamic coating of biomolecules, usually proteins, around the surface of a nanoparticle that forms spontaneously in colloidal nanomaterials upon exposure to biological mediums. Protein coronas can form in many different patterns depending on their size, shape, composition, charge, and surface functional groups, and have properties that vary in different environmental factors like temperature, pH, shearing stress, immersed media composition, and exposing time. These coatings are also changeable according to the conditions of the biochemical and physiochemical surface interactions. Types of protein coronas are known to be divided into two categories: "hard" and "soft". "Hard" coronas have higher-affinity proteins that are irreversibly bonded to the nanoparticle surface, while "soft" coronas have lower-affinity proteins on the nanoparticle surface that are reversibly bound. These reversibly-bound proteins allow for the biomolecules in "soft" protein coronas to be exchanged or detached over time for various applications. This process is governed by the intermolecular protein-nanoparticle and protein-protein interactions that exist within a solution. In "soft" protein coronas, it is common to observe an exchange of proteins at the surface; larger proteins with lower affinities will often aggregate to the surface of the nanoparticle first, and over time, smaller proteins with higher affinities will replace them, "hardening" the corona, known as the Vroman effect.

== Factors affecting formation ==
It is known that multiple physicochemical and biochemical factors influence the formation and composition of protein coronas. Many previous studies have focused on understanding these processes and how they can be utilized.

=== Protein composition and concentration ===
To determine how the protein composition and concentration affects protein coronas, one study incubated silica nanoparticles in plasma medium for 1 hr and observed the formation of the corona. They found that the proteins adsorbed easily to the silica surface and expressed themselves in different patterns depending on the amount of plasma present in the incubated medium. The experiment was run with 3%, 20%, and 80% plasma, and it was discovered that in the case of plasma, where there is a much higher concentration of lower-affinity proteins than high-affinity proteins, the lower-affinity proteins had a tendency to replace the higher-affinity proteins on the surface of the nanoparticle because of their higher abundance within the plasma. From studies like these, it is clear that a protein corona can be altered significantly, depending on the weight and affinity of the biological molecules in a particular medium.

=== Media exposure ===
Another major factor that affects protein coronas is exposure time, or the amount of time a nanoparticle coated in proteins is exposed to fluidic media. Since it is well known that instantly upon introduction of a nanoparticle to a biomolecular medium, a protein corona forms on its surface, one study exposed nanoparticles to biological fluids like human plasma and observed how the length of exposure to these mediums can affect the formation of the corona. After only 30 seconds of interaction, almost 300 proteins were detected adsorbing to the nanoparticle surface, and a majority of those molecules had low affinity (pharmacology) and a large molecular weight. After 1 minute or more of exposure, different protein corona patterns were observed, and of the proteins detected, most of them had a higher affinity and smaller molecular weight, consistent with the Vroman effect. Thus, the length of the exposure time of the nanoparticle to biological fluid can greatly alter the composition and patterns of the protein corona.

In addition to exposure time is the factor of shearing forces. In the past, researchers studied protein-nanoparticle interactions under very static conditions so that variables could be easily controlled. However, these conditions are not very representative of the conditions of the human body where nanoparticles will generally be exposed to shearing stresses and hydrodynamic fluid conditions. Thus, experiments that accounted for fluidic conditions were necessary to understand how protein coronas would endure in the human body. One study found that fluidic flow increased the biodiversity of the protein corona and altered its shape due to the shearing forces present in the environment. Because both of these factors have implications in the functionalization of protein corona nanoparticles, these observations proved the importance of studying protein coronas in the presence of fluidic conditions.

=== Temperature ===
Temperature can also greatly affect protein-nanoparticle interactions. A study performed on Cu nanoparticles showed that as the ambient temperature of the nanoparticles was increased from 15 °C, 27 °C, and 37 °C to 42 °C, the amount of protein adsorbed to the nanoparticle surface also increased. This finding was especially interesting in the effort to utilize protein coronas to treat illnesses, because in introducing these particles into the human body, they will have to exist and function at high temperatures. In feverish individuals, their altered body temperature may potentially change the biodistribution and bio-availability of the nanoparticles. Thus, it is important for researchers to account for temperature effects on protein coronas.

=== pH effects ===
The environmental pH can also affect protein corona formation. It is known that pH is an important factor to be considered when studying the properties and functionality of proteins. pH can alter protein binding affinity in protein-nanoparticle interactions, thus modifying the adsorbed protein pattern at the surface of the nanoparticle. If used for drug delivery methods, the nanoparticles will have to undergo multiple different pH changes in the cellular uptake pathway like blood (neutral pH), exposure media (pH 6.9-7.4), intracellular fluid (pH 6.8), and lysosomes (pH 4.5-5) and be able to keep its corona intact and functional. Cancer tumors especially are known to induce acidic microenvironments as well as contain certain types of proteins that are capable of modifying the protein corona around nanoparticles which can greatly alter the body's therapeutic response to drug molecules.

=== Nanoparticle composition ===
Lastly, the composition of the nanoparticle itself can affect the protein corona formation at its surface. Differences in the hydrophilic or hydrophobic nature of the nanoparticle material can determine the amount of proteins in the corona. Usually, proteins adsorb more easily to hydrophobic materials than hydrophilic materials. As a result, hydrophobic nanoparticles are more likely to induce particle aggregation and higher opsonization in the human body, which can decrease systemic circulation time in the blood.

Additionally, to aid in formation and solubility, nanoparticles often have ligands and functional groups on their surfaces that act like "fingerprints". Protein fingerprints refer to the ability to differentiate or identify proteins using ligands and other methods. These fingerprints allow for nanoparticles to be tailored compositionally to adsorb specific proteins to their surfaces. Nanoparticle surface roughness may also play a role in protein corona formation, since one study found that a rough nanoparticle surface can minimize repulsive interactions between the nanoparticle and parts of the binding proteins, which increases the amount of proteins adsorbed.

== Applications ==
=== Drug delivery ===
Protein coronas can be utilized for a number of different functions, the main one being drug delivery. The corona that forms when nanoparticles come in contact with biological fluid has long been investigated for its potential to deliver important drug molecules or proteins to sites of need within the human body. Nanoparticles are known to have high drug-loading efficiency as well as the ability to easily pass through biological barriers due to their nano scalability. Their composition tunability allows for their toxicity to be controlled, and they can be modified to contain diverse sets of functional groups that can perform specific activities. These qualities of nanoparticles make them ideal for drug delivery capabilities.

A major area of study within the sphere of protein corona drug delivery, is the study of the circulation time of nanoparticles in the body. In order to optimize the effectiveness of a drug, specifying the location where it is delivered and how long it stays there can be extremely useful. Often, macrophages within the blood will detect the presence of the nanoparticles and immediately work to eliminate them from the body. This is not always a good thing from the perspective of drug delivery, and thus studies were performed to prolong circulation time. It was found that when opsonins, like fibrinogen, are numerous in the protein corona, the proteins tend to induce macrophage recognition and subsequent consumption of nanoparticles. Conversely, when the corona is saturated with dysopsonins, like albumin, the macrophages show decreased recognition of the particles and thus, circulation time of the particles is greatly increased. This technique is loosely referred to as the "stealth effect". By tailoring the contents of the protein corona, the length of time a nanoparticle stays in your body can be controlled.

As mentioned previously, nanoparticles can be grown with particular functional groups on their surfaces that induce chemoselectivity. Functional biomolecules like transferrin, insulin, and folic acid are commonly used in cancer-targeting drug delivery systems. Other smaller molecules like anhydride, amine, carboxyl, and thiol can be used to direct nanoparticles to high cellular association with endothelial cells, pancreatic cells, and activated human macrophages. Certain apolipoproteins, such as Apo E, ApoA1, and ApoB-100, could potentially functionalize nanoparticles to target the nervous system.

Another more pressing problem with nanoparticle drug delivery is the tendency for nanoparticles to accumulate at the target site or in various organs, which can become toxic. It is known that the size of nanoparticles dictates their distribution within the body, meaning that nanoparticles with different sizes will tend to accumulate in certain organs. Therefore, size is a very important control factor when considering nanoparticle distribution and accumulation at target sites during drug delivery.

== Sub-topic, viral protein coronas (historical perspective) ==
While historically characterized on synthetic nanoparticles, the formation of a "protein corona", an acquired coat of host macromolecules that masks the native surface topology, is also an established phenomenon in virology; notably, viruses are natural nanoparticles, have been well studied, and provide a plethora of scientific information relevant to this field. Upon contact with physiological fluids, both natural pathogens and engineered viral vectors sequester specific blood, mucosal, or extracellular host proteins. This bio-interface dictates cellular tropism, regulates genome uncoating kinetics, drives immune evasion, or exacerbates inflammatory pathologies.

Observations preceding the formal terminology The following entries document the early historical period where the physical phenomena, host interactions, and biological mechanisms of the virus coat were discovered and profiled before the specific terms "protein corona" or "viral protein corona" were adapted from nanotechnology fields.

1979(Hepatitis B virus, uses albumin as a bridge): Researchers observed that the Hepatitis B virus (HBV) surface antigen (HBsAg) contains non-immunological binding sites that adsorb host polymerized human serum albumin (pHSA) from blood plasma. This host protein coating acts as a physical molecular bridge, allowing the virus to lock onto albumin receptors present on human hepatocyte.

1983 (Avian sarcoma virus, fibronectin modulates cell adhesion): Studies on retroviruses revealed that plasma fibronectin, an abundant extracellular matrix glycoprotein, spontaneously binds to the envelopes of Avian sarcoma virus and various leukemia viruses. This non-specific deposition of host proteins creates an environmental coating that dynamically modulates how effectively the virus adheres to target cell membranes.

1991 (HIV-1, complement factors shield epitopes): Early demonstration that upon entering human serum, the virions are instantly decorated by host complement proteins, specifically C3 fragments (C3b and iC3b). Rather than neutralizing the virus, this acquired host protein corona shields the underlying viral epitopes and allows HIV-1 to exploit complement receptors on immune cells, enhancing its overall infectivity.

1992 (Hepatitis C, epitope shielding by Apolipoprotein E): Following the isolation of the Hepatitis C virus (HCV), it was discovered that the virus does not circulate as a naked particle in plasma. Instead, it forms a hybrid complex with host low-density lipoproteins (LDLs) and Apolipoprotein E (ApoE). This lipo-protein shield acts as a corona that physically masks viral epitopes from neutralizing antibodies, playing a vital role in viral immune evasion.

1999 (Echovirus / enteroviruses, albumin blocks infection): Landmark work that shows echovirus infection (specifically echovirus 7) is blocked by physiological concentrations of normal albumin, which acts as a protective coating that reversibley interacts with the virus capsid and directly inhibits premature viral uncoating.

2000 (Echovirus / enteroviruses, fatty acid deplete albumin acts as an uncoating trigger): Follow-up mechanistic studies demonstrated that changing the functional properties of this albumin coat fundamentally alters its structural interaction with the virus. When depleted of bound fatty acids, the surrounding albumin coat shifts from an inhibitor into an uncoating trigger, actively promoting capsid expansion and inducing the formation of metastable enterovirus uncoating intermediates (A-particles).

2006 (Human adenovirus, factor X affects tropism): Early gene therapy investigations demonstrated that the non-enveloped adenovirus capsid binds host coagulation factors (such as Factor X) directly out of human blood. This protein coat acts as a physical bridge, misdirecting the therapeutic vector away from its target tissue and into liver cells.

2007 (Lentivirus / retroviral vectors, apolipoprotein E affects tropism): Because enveloped retroviral vectors acquire their outer lipid membrane from the host cell during budding, their surface charge recruits a protein coat dense in host apolipoproteins such as ApoE. This alters target cell delivery, directing vector uptake through cellular lipid pathways rather than intended viral receptor.

2019 (Echovirus/enterovirus, early albumin research verified): The dualistic albumin interaction with some echovirus strains is observed at the near atomic level using cryo-em, cementing it's role in uncoating twenty years after it was first discovered.

Further research shows uncoating of echoviruses occurs within the endosome and is first primed by fatty acid deplete albumin, leading to viral capsid confirmation changes, that facilitate attachment to the neonatal Fc receptor prior to uncoating. Thereby, echoviruses have evolved to usurp their "viral protein corona", albumin, by sensing it via an allosteric mechanism, to increase their stability within extracellular fluids until they reach their target tissues; and then viral particles are finally sequestered into the endosome for uncoating, where albumin switches it's role to induce the viral particles into a metastable state.

Formal introduction of the protein corona and viral protein corona paradigm The following entries represent the modern era of research initiated by breakthrough papers that formally established, defined, and named the specific "protein corona" and "viral protein corona" concepts using high-resolution proteomic mapping on wild-type pathogens:

2019 (Respiratory syncytial virus & herpes simplex virus type 1, immune evasion and amyloid catalyst): Foundational wild-type pathogen mapping formally introduced the "viral protein corona" paradigm into virology. Using Respiratory Syncytial Virus (RSV) and Herpes Simplex Virus Type 1 (HSV-1) as model pathogens, researchers proved that wild-type viruses collect distinct structural protein crowns depending on the biofluid microenvironment, which directly controls immune activation. Furthermore, the HSV-1 corona was shown to bind host amyloid peptides, acting as a catalytic surface that accelerates toxic amyloid-beta (Aβ_{42}) aggregation linked to Alzheimer's disease pathology.

2021 (Severe acute respiratory syndrome coronavirus 2, masking epitopes): High-resolution mapping during the global pandemic verified that the trimeric spike protein profile of SARS-CoV-2 sequesters human serum albumins and apolipoproteins into an active corona coat. This structural protein barrier covers vulnerable viral neutralization sites, preventing binding from host neutralizing antibodies.

2021 (Influenza A Virus, surfactants to aid dissemination): Comprehensive mucosal interface tracing demonstrated that as Influenza A virions travel through lung mucosal boundaries, they acquire a fluid, shifting protein crown composed of host surfactant proteins and mucins. This microenvironment coat establishes an equilibrium that prevents the virus from getting permanently trapped in airway mucus while preserving cellular attachment.

2022 (Dengue virus, negative affect on immunoassays): Investigations into vector-borne flaviviruses showed that their pre-formed "viral protein corona" was a hindrance to analytical immunoassays using a dip stick test. This shows that a protein corona should be considered as a determining factor when analysing viral samples of natural origin.

=== Summary ===
These historical biological phenomena (pre 2019), established that viruses interact with biological fluids through similar interface dynamics as man made nanoparticles. Modern research using proteomics has broadened this concept, formally defining the "viral protein corona" as a critical driver of viral pathogenesis. Many examples of "viral protein corona" exist in nature and most are as yet unknown. Future research will no doubt find many more, some of which may prove very useful to nanoscience and nanomedicine. Given that there are many examples of "viral protein corona" as shown above, and others not listed, that pre-date the conception of this phrase, historically then, the foundations of this field of nanoscience can be seen to originate from landmark discoveries made using classical virological and biochemical techniques, before modern terminology intervened and evolved, and prior to the development of proteomics.
