= Gait (disambiguation) =

Gait is the pattern of limb movement during locomotion.

Gait may also refer to:

== Specific gaits ==
- Gait (human)
- Canine gait
- Horse gait

== People ==
- Andrew Gait (born 1978), South African cricketer
- Edward Gait (1863–1950), British Indian administrator
- Gary Gait (born 1967), Canadian lacrosse player, twin brother of Paul
- Paul Gait (born 1967), Canadian lacrosse player, twin brother of Gary

== Other uses ==
- GAIT (wireless), wireless standard to enable cross-operation of wireless telephone technologies
- GAIT element, or gamma interferon inhibitor of translation element, in biology
