= HNRPH3 =

Protein-coding gene in humans

HNRNPH3

Identifiers
- Aliases: HNRNPH3, 2H9, HNRPH3, heterogeneous nuclear ribonucleoprotein H3
- External IDs: OMIM: 602324; MGI: 1926462; GeneCards: HNRNPH3

Gene location (Human)
Chr.	Chromosome 10 (human)
Band	10q21.3	Start	68,331,174 bp
Band	10q21.3	End	68,343,193 bp

Gene location (Mouse)
Chr.	Chromosome 10 (mouse)
Band	10|10 B4	Start	63,014,664 bp
Band	10|10 B4	End	63,024,217 bp
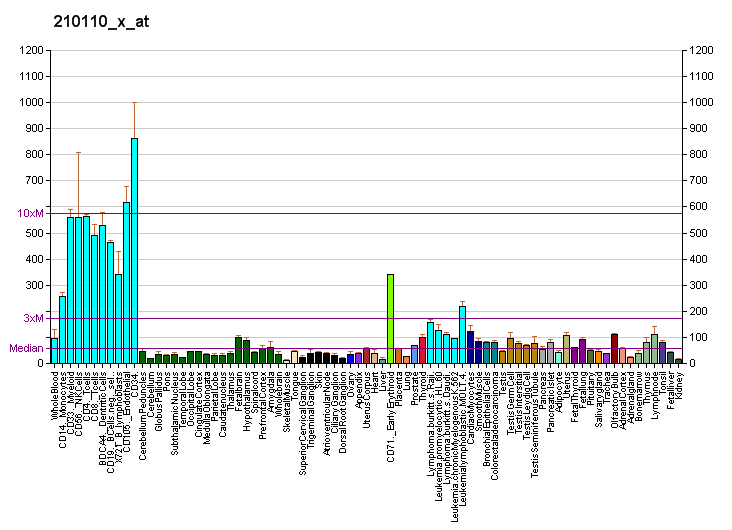

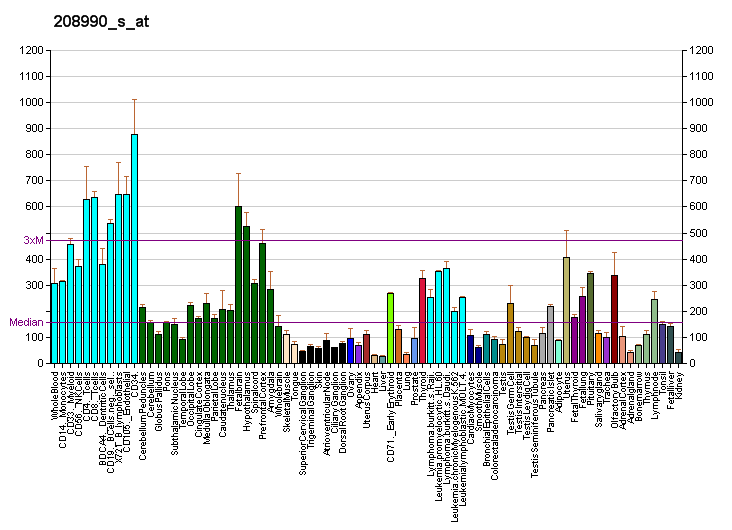

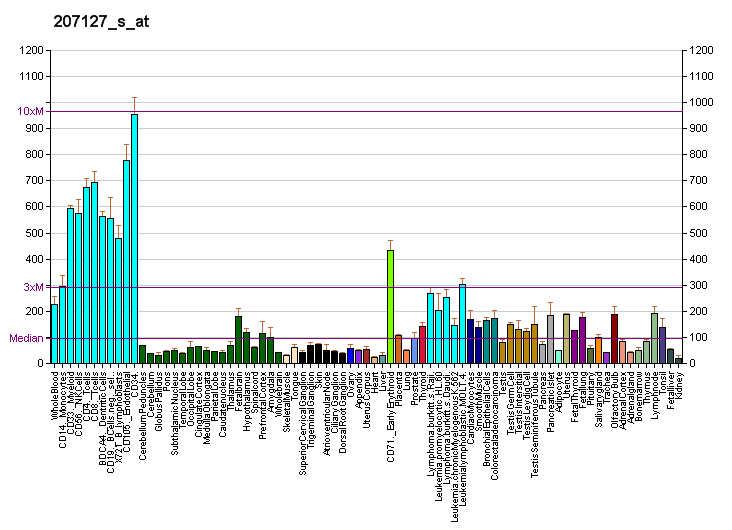
RNA expression pattern
Bgee	Human / Mouse (ortholog); Top expressed in: tendon of biceps brachii; ventricular zone; ganglionic eminence; left ovary; right ovary; body of uterus; canal of the cervix; cerebellar hemisphere; left lobe of thyroid gland; right hemisphere of cerebellum / Top expressed in: saccule; otic placode; neural layer of retina; otic vesicle; superior cervical ganglion; mandibular prominence; maxillary prominence; ganglionic eminence; primitive streak; ventricular zone; More reference expression data
BioGPS	More reference expression data
Gene ontology
Molecular function	protein binding; nucleic acid binding; RNA binding
Cellular component	spliceosomal complex; nucleus; nucleoplasm
Biological process	mRNA splicing, via spliceosome; mRNA processing; RNA processing; epithelial cell differentiation; RNA splicing
Sources:Amigo / QuickGO
Orthologs
Databases	NCBI: entry; OMA: entry
Species	Human	Mouse
Entrez	3189	432467
Ensembl	ENSG00000096746	ENSMUSG00000020069
UniProt	P31942	n/a
RefSeq (mRNA)	NM_012207; NM_021644; NM_001322434; NM_001322436; NM_001322437 NM_001322438; NM_001322439; NM_001322440; NM_001322441; NM_001322442; NM_001322443; NM_001322444; NM_001322445; NM_001322446; NM_001322447; NM_001322448; NM_001322449; NM_001322450; NM_001322451; NM_001322452; NM_001322453	NM_001079824; NM_001347457; NM_001359260; NM_001359261
RefSeq (protein)	NP_001309363; NP_001309365; NP_001309366; NP_001309367; NP_001309368 NP_001309369; NP_001309370; NP_001309371; NP_001309372; NP_001309373; NP_001309374; NP_001309375; NP_001309376; NP_001309377; NP_001309378; NP_001309379; NP_001309380; NP_001309381; NP_001309382; NP_036339; NP_067676	n/a
Location (UCSC)	Chr 10: 68.33 – 68.34 Mb	Chr 10: 63.01 – 63.02 Mb
PubMed search
- Wikidata
View/Edit Human	View/Edit Mouse

Heterogeneous nuclear ribonucleoprotein H3 is a protein that in humans is encoded by the HNRNPH3 gene.

This gene belongs to the subfamily of ubiquitously expressed heterogeneous nuclear ribonucleoproteins (hnRNPs). The hnRNPs are RNA binding proteins and they complex with heterogeneous nuclear RNA (hnRNA).

These proteins are associated with pre-mRNAs in the nucleus and appear to influence pre-mRNA processing and other aspects of mRNA metabolism and transport. While all of the hnRNPs are present in the nucleus, some seem to shuttle between the nucleus and the cytoplasm. The hnRNP proteins have distinct nucleic acid binding properties.

The protein encoded by this gene has two repeats of quasi-RRM domains that bind to RNAs. It is localized in nuclear bodies of the nucleus. This protein is involved in the splicing process and it also participates in early heat shock-induced splicing arrest by transiently leaving the hnRNP complexes. Multiple alternative transcript variants seem to be present for this gene and some appear to have intronic regions in the mRNA. Presently, only two transcript variants are fully described.
