= APOBEC1 =

Protein-coding gene in the species Homo sapiens

Identifiers
- Aliases: APOBEC1, APOBEC-1, BEDP, CDAR1, HEPR, apolipoprotein B mRNA editing enzyme catalytic subunit 1
- External IDs: OMIM: 600130; MGI: 103298; GeneCards: APOBEC1
Enzyme activity
EC #	BRENDA	ExPASy	KEGG	MetaCyc
3.5.4.36	↗	↗	↗	↗

Gene location (Human)
Chr.	Chromosome 12 (human)
Band	12p13.31	Start	7,649,400 bp
Band	12p13.31	End	7,665,908 bp

Gene location (Mouse)
Chr.	Chromosome 6 (mouse)
Band	6 F1|6 57.68 cM	Start	122,554,751 bp
Band	6 F1|6 57.68 cM	End	122,579,403 bp
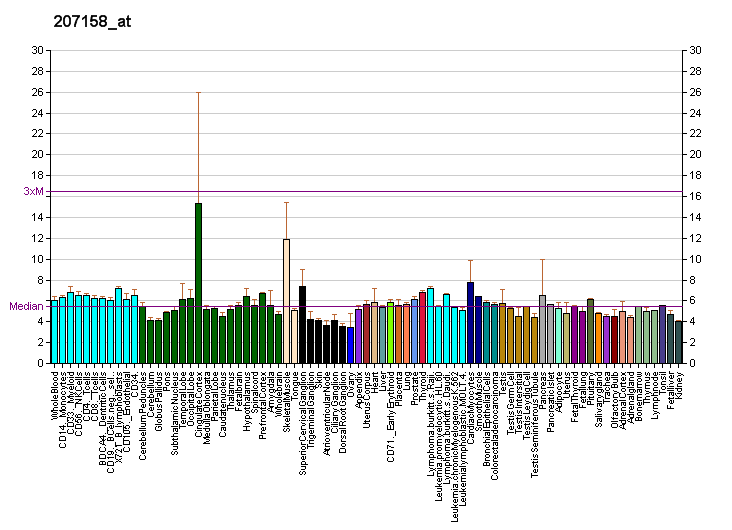
RNA expression pattern
Bgee	Human / Mouse (ortholog); Top expressed in: jejunal mucosa; duodenum; mucosa of ileum; testicle; mucosa of transverse colon; gastric mucosa; islet of Langerhans; rectum; gallbladder; muscle tissue / Top expressed in: granulocyte; stroma of bone marrow; pyloric antrum; Ileal epithelium; left colon; spleen; jejunum; duodenum; blood; mucous cell of stomach; More reference expression data
BioGPS	More reference expression data
Gene ontology
Molecular function	enzyme activator activity; hydrolase activity, acting on carbon-nitrogen (but not peptide) bonds, in cyclic amidines; protein binding; mRNA binding; cytidine deaminase activity; RNA binding; catalytic activity; zinc ion binding; hydrolase activity; cytosine deaminase activity; metal ion binding; protein domain specific binding; ribonucleoprotein complex binding; mRNA 3'-UTR AU-rich region binding
Cellular component	nucleus; nucleoplasm; cytoplasm
Biological process	DNA cytosine deamination; cellular response to insulin stimulus; response to osmotic stress; mRNA processing; RNA processing; response to calcium ion; response to ethanol; regulation of cell population proliferation; response to zinc ion; defense response to virus; cytidine to uridine editing; response to gamma radiation; mRNA stabilization; DNA demethylation; lipoprotein metabolic process; lipoprotein transport; positive regulation of catalytic activity; lipoprotein biosynthetic process; lipid metabolism; negative regulation of DNA methylation-dependent heterochromatin assembly; positive regulation of mRNA modification; cytidine deamination; mRNA modification; triglyceride metabolic process; negative regulation of triglyceride metabolic process
Sources:Amigo / QuickGO
Orthologs
Databases	NCBI: entry; OMA: entry
Species	Human	Mouse
Entrez	339	11810
Ensembl	ENSG00000111701	ENSMUSG00000040613
UniProt	P41238	P51908
RefSeq (mRNA)	NM_005889; NM_001304566; NM_001644	NM_001134391; NM_031159
RefSeq (protein)	NP_001291495; NP_001635; NP_005880	NP_001127863; NP_112436
Location (UCSC)	Chr 12: 7.65 – 7.67 Mb	Chr 6: 122.55 – 122.58 Mb
PubMed search
- Wikidata
View/Edit Human	View/Edit Mouse

Apolipoprotein B mRNA editing enzyme, catalytic polypeptide 1 also known as C->U-editing enzyme APOBEC-1 is a protein that in humans is encoded by the APOBEC1 gene.

This gene encodes a member of the APOBEC protein family and the cytidine deaminase enzyme family. The encoded protein forms a multiple-protein RNA editing holoenzyme with APOBEC1 complementation factor (A1CF). This holoenzyme is involved in the editing of cytosine-to-uracil (C-to-U) nucleotide bases in apolipoprotein B and neurofibromin 1 mRNAs.

APOBEC-1 (A1) has been linked with cholesterol control, cancer development and inhibition of viral replication. Its function relies on introducing a stop codon into apolipoprotein B (ApoB) mRNA, which alters lipid metabolism in the gastrointestinal tract. The editing mechanism is highly specific. A1’s deamination of the cytosine base yields uracil, which creates a stop codon in the mRNA.

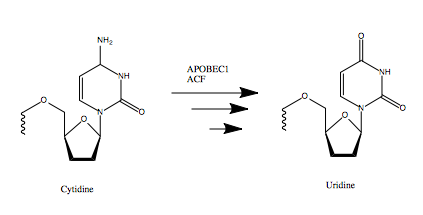
The overall deamination of cytidine to form uridine.

A1 has been linked with both positive and negative health effects. In rodents, it has wide tissue distribution where as in humans, it is only expressed in the small intestine.

== Gene ==
APOBEC1 lies on human chromosome 12.

== Function ==
ApoB is essential in the assembly of very low density lipoproteins from lipids, in the liver and small intestine. By editing ApoB, it forces only the smaller product, ApoB48, to be expressed, which greatly inhibits lipoprotein production. However, A1 is currently found only at extremely low levels in the human liver and intestine, while it is highly expressed in rodents. In humans, A1 is found exclusively in gastrointestinal epithelial cells.

== Mechanism ==
A1 modifies the cytosine base at position 6666 on the ApoB mRNA strand through a deamination. An A1 dimer first binds to ACF, which forms the binding complex that is then able to eliminate the amine group from cytosine.

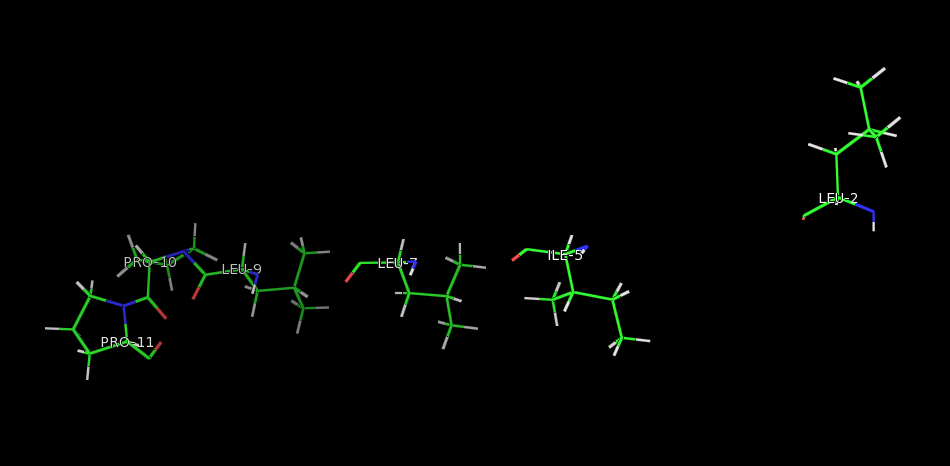
These residues (Leu-182 to Pro-191) are necessary for dimerization of APOBEC1, which is necessary to form the correct enzyme complex with ACF. During experimentation, substituted leucine and isoleucine residues significantly reduced the deamination of cytosine.

ACF binds to the mooring sequence, which puts A1 in position to edit the correct residue. By converting cytosine to uracil, A1 changes the codon from CAA, which codes for glutamine during transcription, to UAA, a stop codon. This stop codon yields the much shorter protein ApoB48 instead of ApoB100, as the mRNA is predisposed to transcript. The editing amount, or expression, of A1 performs is correlated with the insulin concentration in the nucleus, the site of modification. Tests involving A1 mutants with various deleted amino acid sequences have shown that editing activity is dependent on residues 14 to 35. Like all APOBEC proteins, A1 coordinates a zinc atom with two cysteine and one histidine residues that serve as a Lewis acid. Hydrolytic deamination of the cytosine amine group then occurs, catalyzed by the proton transfer from the nearby glutamic acid residue, and the enzymatic structure is conserved by a proline residue.

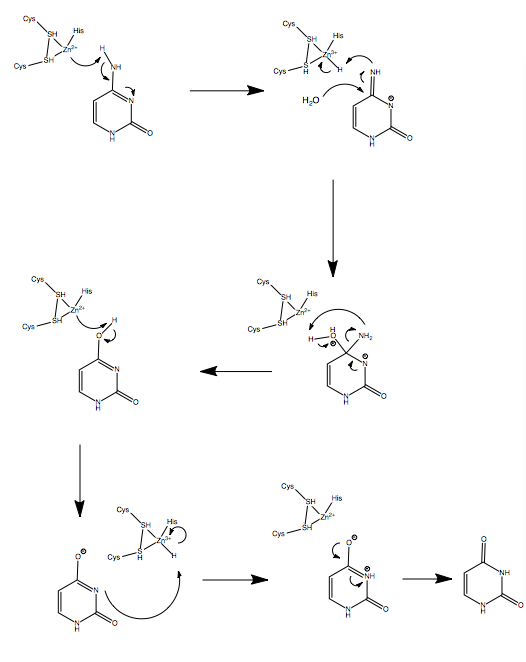
Possible mechanism for C-to-U modification using Zinc complex with H-66, Cys-93, and Cys-96.

== Structure ==
The structure of A1 relies on three dimensional folds induced by a zinc complex. These folds allow the enzyme to access the RNA specifically. Deletion tests with mutant strands have shown that residues 181 to 210 are integral to mRNA editing, and there is most likely a beta-turn at proline residues 190 and 191. Specifically, L182, I185, and L189 are integral to the complex’s function, most likely due to their importance to dimerization. Substituting these residues has no predicted impact on secondary structure, so the significant decrease in editing activity is best explained by the alteration of the side-chains, which are integral to dimer structure. Amino acid replacements at these sites deactivated deamination. The C-terminal of enzyme structure is more strongly expressed in the nucleus, hence the site of modification, while the 181 to 210 residues indicate that the enzyme is in the cytoplasm. These are regulatory factors.

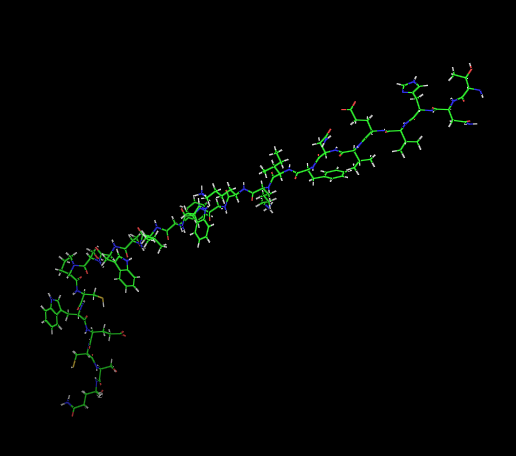
APOBEC1 catalytic active site, residue regionResidues 59-70, 82-95Linking glycine represents residues 71-81, which are not related to activation

== Disease relevance ==
The low levels of A1 in humans are one reason why high lipid intake is damaging to health. ApoB48 is essential for the assembly and secretion of triglyceride-rich chylomicrons, which are necessary as a response to high-fat intake. ApoB100 are metabolized in the bloodstream to LDL cholesterol, high levels of which are associated with atherosclerosis. While A1 has a negligible impact on human lipid synthesis, at high concentrations it can be genotoxic. Its diffusion toward the nucleic membrane can lead it to mutate DNA sequences that are actively transcribed on the genome. In single growth assays, A1 has been found to impact HIV replications. Additionally, A1 has reduced Hepatitis B virus (HBV) DNA replication, although the mechanism is still not known. The antiviral properties of A1 extend to both DNA and RNA due to its deamination function, which can hinder DNA replication and consequently suppress further infection by HIV or HBV. A pan-cancer study shows that A1 mRNA level is associated with adverse prognosis as well as higher rate of the human genomic insertions and deletions (indels), particularly in-frame ones, which proposes its endogenous mutator activity. There has also been evidence that A1 also edits at NF1, related to tumors in nerve cells.

== Interactions ==
APOBEC1 has been shown to interact with:

- ACF
- BAG4, and
- SYNCRIP.

== See also ==
- Apolipoprotein B
- Post-transcriptional modification
- Mutation
- Deamination
- NF1
- Dimer (chemistry)
- Chromosome 12 (human)
