= Messenger RNP =

Messenger RNA bound to ribonucleoproteins

Messenger RNP (messenger ribonucleoprotein; mRNP) is mRNA with bound proteins. mRNA does not exist "naked" in vivo but is always bound by various proteins while being synthesized, spliced, exported, and translated in the cytoplasm.

Messenger RNPs were first discovered in Alexander S. Spirin's laboratory in Moscow, Russia in 1964. The discovery was based in their study of fish embryo cytoplasm extracts, where they found these mRNPs. This finding was discovered after the mRNA of the fish embryo was centrifuged. The mRNA liquid separated into two parts, having the scientists question what is separate of the mRNA from the ribosomes. Spirin and his collaborators analyzed the mRNA against CsCl density gradients and discovered that parts of the mRNA were coated in proteins. The weight ratio of mRNPs was found to be 1:3, mRNA to protein. mRNPs were thus denoted as informosomes by the lab.

There are three major informosomes found in mammalian cells: nuclear ribonucleoproteins, cytoplasmic informosomes, and polyribosomal messenger ribonucleoproteins. It was hypothesized by researchers that major roles of informosomes are to assist in mRNAs translocation from the nucleus to the cytoplasm, protect the mRNA against degradation, and help regulate protein formation.

When mRNA is being synthesized by RNA polymerase, this nascent mRNA is already bound by RNA 5′ end 7-methyl-guanosine capping enzymes. Later, the pre-mRNA is bound by the spliceosome containing exon and intron definition complexes and proteins and RNA that catalyze the chemical reactions of splicing. Joan Steitz and Michael Lerner and collaborators showed that the small nuclear RNAs (snRNAs) are complexed into small nuclear ribonuclear proteins (snRNPs). Christine Guthrie and collaborators showed that specific snRNAs encoded by single copy genes in yeast base pair with the pre-mRNA and direct each step in splicing. The spliced mRNA is bound by another set of proteins which help in export from the nucleus to the cytoplasm. In vertebrates exon-exon junction are marked by exon junction complexes which in the cytosol can trigger nonsense mediated decay if the exon-exon junction is more than 50-55 nt downstream of the stop codon.

== Learning and memory ==
As described in a 2022 review, long-term memory utilizes messenger RNP.

Rats with a new, strong long-term memory due to contextual fear conditioning have reduced expression of about 1,000 genes and increased expression of about 500 genes in the hippocampus 24 hours after training, thus exhibiting modified expression of 9.17% of the rat hippocampal genome. Reduced gene expressions were associated with methylations of those genes and hypomethylation was found for genes involved in synaptic transmission and neuronal differentiation.

As described by Doyle and Kiebler, “in the mature brain mRNA localization into dendrites of fully polarized neurons serves a distinct function. The presence of a specific set of transcripts and the entire translational machinery at dendritic spines suggests that local translation could be regulated in an activity-dependent manner.”

== Neurodegenerative diseases ==
Neurodegenerative diseases in RNP granules are caused by genetic mutations. RNP granules store specific types of mRNAs under tight translational control while forming different types. Neuronal RNP granules that are connected to RNA binding proteins show signs of causing neurodevelopment, neurodegeneration or neuropsychiatric disorders. An example of one of these diseases would be spinal muscular atrophy (SMA) which affect the small nuclear ribonucleoprotein (snRNP). Although it is still unknown, increasing evidence ties neurodegeneration diseases with altered RNP granule homeostasis creating a concept of hypo and hyper-assembly diseases of RNPs. Hyper-assembly of RNP granule can be caused by two effects, one by mutations in the RNA binding protein while the other being an expansion of nucleotide repeats in the RNA. Another neurodegenerative disease amyotrophic lateral sclerosis (ALS) which is affected by the hyper assemble of RNP granule components. Even though neuronal cells are more susceptible to hypo- or hyper- assembly of RNP components there is still much unknown in terms of the full mutation process.

Neuronal RNP granules assembly and regulation with flexible spatio-temporal that compartmentalize gene expression. The advanced technology that is present today helps uncover the behavior of neuronal RNP granules. It was recently discovered in a vitro study that the dynamic properties and structure of these RNP granules is fluid and generated through liquid-liquid phase separation. Post-translational modification (PTM) of granule components have the means to modulate binding affinities that can do both condensation and dissolution.

== See also ==
- Heterogeneous ribonucleoprotein particle
- Messenger RNA
- Precursor mRNA
