= TUBB =

Protein-coding gene in the species Homo sapiens

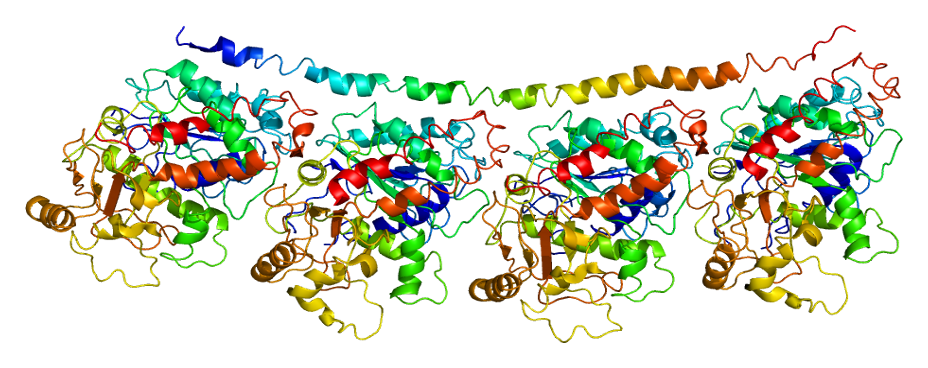

Identifiers
- Aliases: TUBB, CDCBM6, M40, OK/SW-cl.56, TUBB1, TUBB5, CSCSC1, tubulin beta class I
- External IDs: OMIM: 191130; MGI: 107812; GeneCards: TUBB
Available structures
PDB	Ortholog search: PDBe RCSB
PDB	List of PDB id codes 3QNZ, 3QO0

Gene location (Human)
Chr.	Chromosome 6 (human)
Band	6p21.33	Start	30,717,435 bp
Band	6p21.33	End	30,725,538 bp

Gene location (Mouse)
Chr.	Chromosome 17 (mouse)
Band	17|17 B1	Start	36,144,813 bp
Band	17|17 B1	End	36,149,198 bp
RNA expression pattern
Bgee	Human / Mouse (ortholog); Top expressed in: ganglionic eminence; ventricular zone; smooth muscle tissue; stromal cell of endometrium; appendix; ovary; left ovary; islet of Langerhans; placenta; right ovary / Top expressed in: medial ganglionic eminence; saccule; otic placode; otic vesicle; tail of embryo; maxillary prominence; primitive streak; somite; mandibular prominence; hand; More reference expression data
BioGPS	n/a
Gene ontology
Molecular function	GTPase activating protein binding; nucleotide binding; protein domain specific binding; protein-containing complex binding; GTP binding; structural molecule activity; structural constituent of cytoskeleton; protein binding; GTPase activity; MHC class I protein binding; ubiquitin protein ligase binding
Cellular component	cell body; extracellular region; nuclear envelope lumen; cytoplasmic ribonucleoprotein granule; extracellular exosome; extracellular matrix; microtubule; cytoskeleton; nucleus; microtubule cytoskeleton; azurophil granule lumen; cytoplasm; membrane raft; protein-containing complex
Biological process	cytoskeleton-dependent intracellular transport; spindle assembly; cell division; G2/M transition of mitotic cell cycle; cellular process or phenomenon; natural killer cell mediated cytotoxicity; microtubule-based process; neutrophil degranulation; ciliary basal body-plasma membrane docking; regulation of G2/M transition of mitotic cell cycle; microtubule cytoskeleton organization; mitotic cell cycle; regulation of synapse organization; cytoskeleton organization
Sources:Amigo / QuickGO
Orthologs
Databases	NCBI: entry; OMA: entry
Species	Human	Mouse
Entrez	203068	22154
Ensembl	ENSG00000196230; ENSG00000232421; ENSG00000183311; ENSG00000224156; ENSG00000235067 ENSG00000232575; ENSG00000227739; ENSG00000229684	ENSMUSG00000001525
UniProt	P07437; Q5SU16	P99024
RefSeq (mRNA)	NM_001293212; NM_001293213; NM_001293214; NM_001293215; NM_001293216 NM_178014	NM_011655
RefSeq (protein)	NP_001280141; NP_001280142; NP_001280143; NP_001280144; NP_001280145 NP_821133; NP_821133.1	NP_035785
Location (UCSC)	Chr 6: 30.72 – 30.73 Mb	Chr 17: 36.14 – 36.15 Mb
PubMed search
- Wikidata
View/Edit Human	View/Edit Mouse

Tubulin beta chain is a protein that in humans is encoded by the TUBB gene.

== Interactions ==
TUBB has been shown to interact with NCOA6 and SYT9.

== See also ==
- Tubulin
