= SYT7 =

Protein-coding gene in the species Homo sapiens

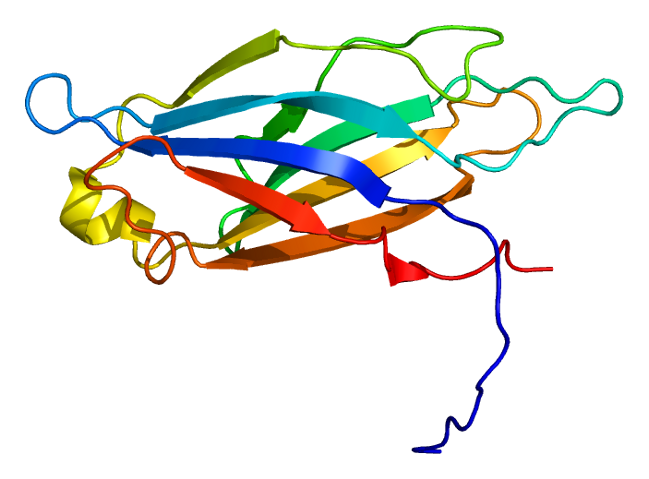

Identifiers
- Aliases: SYT7, IPCA-7, IPCA7, PCANAP7, SYT-VII, SYTVII, synaptotagmin 7
- External IDs: OMIM: 604146; MGI: 1859545; GeneCards: SYT7
Available structures
PDB	Ortholog search: PDBe RCSB
PDB	List of PDB id codes 2D8K

Gene location (Human)
Chr.	Chromosome 11 (human)
Band	11q12.2	Start	61,513,714 bp
Band	11q12.2	End	61,581,148 bp

Gene location (Mouse)
Chr.	Chromosome 19 (mouse)
Band	19|19 A	Start	10,366,454 bp
Band	19|19 A	End	10,430,544 bp
RNA expression pattern
Bgee	Human / Mouse (ortholog); Top expressed in: islet of Langerhans; right hemisphere of cerebellum; right frontal lobe; Brodmann area 9; prefrontal cortex; cerebellar vermis; cingulate gyrus; anterior cingulate cortex; right lobe of liver; pituitary gland / Top expressed in: medial dorsal nucleus; medial geniculate nucleus; dentate gyrus; piriform cortex; substantia nigra; primary visual cortex; dentate gyrus of hippocampal formation granule cell; cerebellar cortex; cerebellar vermis; lobe of cerebellum; More reference expression data
BioGPS	n/a
Gene ontology
Molecular function	calcium ion binding; metal ion binding; protein binding; SNARE binding; syntaxin binding; clathrin binding; phosphatidylinositol-4,5-bisphosphate binding; calcium-dependent phospholipid binding; calmodulin binding; phosphatidylserine binding
Cellular component	integral component of membrane; membrane; synapse; synaptic vesicle membrane; cell junction; terminal bouton; dense core granule; extracellular exosome; cytoplasmic vesicle; transport vesicle membrane; cytosol; synaptic vesicle; presynaptic membrane; lysosome; peroxisome; peroxisomal membrane; phagocytic vesicle membrane; plasma membrane; lysosomal membrane; early phagosome; dendrite; soma; axon terminus; axon; neuron projection; exocytic vesicle; hippocampal mossy fiber to CA3 synapse; glutamatergic synapse; GABA-ergic synapse; integral component of presynaptic membrane
Biological process	regulation of insulin secretion; positive regulation of calcium ion-dependent exocytosis; exocytosis; regulation of bone remodeling; plasma membrane repair; calcium-ion regulated exocytosis; regulation of calcium ion-dependent exocytosis; calcium ion-regulated exocytosis of neurotransmitter; regulation of glucagon secretion; phagosome-lysosome fusion; synaptic vesicle recycling; vesicle-mediated cholesterol transport; regulation of phagocytosis; vesicle fusion; calcium ion regulated lysosome exocytosis; phagocytosis; regulation of dopamine secretion; short-term synaptic potentiation; vesicle-mediated transport; cellular response to calcium ion; calcium-dependent activation of synaptic vesicle fusion; regulation of synaptic vesicle endocytosis
Sources:Amigo / QuickGO
Orthologs
Databases	NCBI: entry; OMA: entry
Species	Human	Mouse
Entrez	9066	54525
Ensembl	ENSG00000011347	ENSMUSG00000024743
UniProt	O43581	Q9R0N7
RefSeq (mRNA)	NM_001252065; NM_001300773; NM_004200; NM_001365809; NM_001370210 NM_001370211	NM_018801; NM_173067; NM_173068; NM_001373944
RefSeq (protein)	NP_001238994; NP_001287702; NP_004191; NP_001352738; NP_001357139 NP_001357140	NP_061271; NP_775090; NP_775091
Location (UCSC)	Chr 11: 61.51 – 61.58 Mb	Chr 19: 10.37 – 10.43 Mb
PubMed search
- Wikidata
View/Edit Human	View/Edit Mouse

Synaptotagmin-7 is a protein that in humans is encoded by the SYT7 gene.

== Function ==
Synaptotagmins, such as SYT7, are calcium-dependent phospholipid-binding proteins known for their role in synaptic exocytosis and neurotransmitter release. Significant expression has also been observed in the prostate and other tissues. See MIM 600782 [supplied by OMIM]

== Interactions ==
SYT7 has been shown to interact with SYNCRIP.
