= HNRNPAB =

Protein-coding gene in humans

Identifiers
- Aliases: HNRNPAB, ABBP1, HNRPAB, heterogeneous nuclear ribonucleoprotein A/B
- External IDs: OMIM: 602688; MGI: 1330294; GeneCards: HNRNPAB
Available structures
PDB	Ortholog search: PDBe RCSB
PDB	List of PDB id codes 3S7R

Gene location (Human)
Chr.	Chromosome 5 (human)
Band	5q35.3	Start	178,204,533 bp
Band	5q35.3	End	178,211,163 bp

Gene location (Mouse)
Chr.	Chromosome 11 (mouse)
Band	11|11 B1.3	Start	51,490,927 bp
Band	11|11 B1.3	End	51,497,674 bp
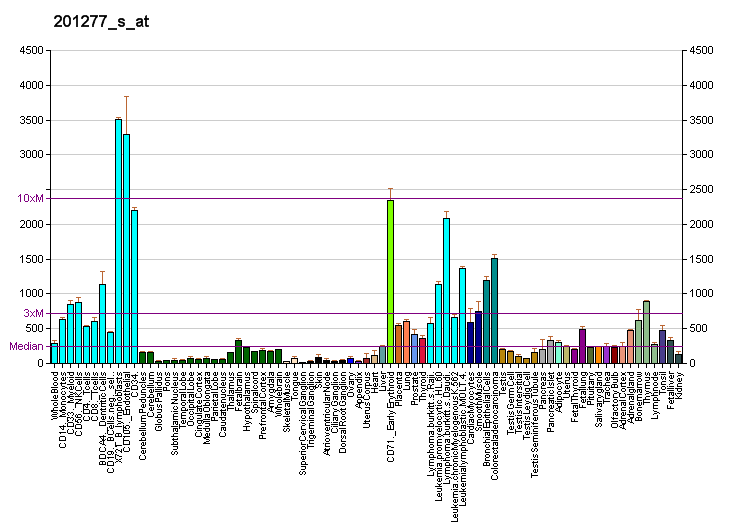
RNA expression pattern
Bgee	Human / Mouse (ortholog); Top expressed in: mucosa of sigmoid colon; embryo; ganglionic eminence; human penis; mucosa of ileum; ventricular zone; mucosa of transverse colon; rectum; vulva; skin of thigh / Top expressed in: primitive streak; abdominal wall; medial ganglionic eminence; condyle; hair follicle; vas deferens; endothelial cell of lymphatic vessel; Rostral migratory stream; renal corpuscle; Gonadal ridge; More reference expression data
BioGPS	More reference expression data
Gene ontology
Molecular function	DNA-binding transcription factor activity; nucleic acid binding; sequence-specific DNA binding; protein binding; mRNA binding; RNA binding; sequence-specific double-stranded DNA binding
Cellular component	cytoplasm; RNA polymerase II transcription regulator complex; nucleus; nucleoplasm; ribonucleoprotein complex
Biological process	positive regulation of transcription, DNA-templated; epithelial to mesenchymal transition
Sources:Amigo / QuickGO
Orthologs
Databases	NCBI: entry; OMA: entry
Species	Human	Mouse
Entrez	3182	15384
Ensembl	ENSG00000197451	ENSMUSG00000020358
UniProt	Q99729	Q99020
RefSeq (mRNA)	NM_031266; NM_004499	NM_001048061; NM_010448
RefSeq (protein)	NP_004490; NP_112556	NP_001041526; NP_034578
Location (UCSC)	Chr 5: 178.2 – 178.21 Mb	Chr 11: 51.49 – 51.5 Mb
PubMed search
- Wikidata
View/Edit Human	View/Edit Mouse

Heterogeneous nuclear ribonucleoprotein A/B, also known as HNRNPAB, is a protein which in humans is encoded by the HNRNPAB gene. Although this gene is named HNRNPAB in reference to its first cloning as an RNA binding protein with similarity to HNRNP A and HNRNP B, it is not a member of the HNRNP A/B subfamily of HNRNPs, but groups together closely with HNRNPD/AUF1 and HNRNPDL.

== Function ==
This gene belongs to the subfamily of ubiquitously expressed heterogeneous nuclear ribonucleoproteins (hnRNPs). The hnRNPs are produced by RNA polymerase II and are components of the heterogeneous nuclear RNA (hnRNA) complexes. They are associated with pre-mRNAs in the nucleus and appear to influence pre-mRNA processing and other aspects of mRNA metabolism and transport. While all of the hnRNPs are present in the nucleus, some seem to shuttle between the nucleus and the cytoplasm. The hnRNP proteins have distinct nucleic acid binding properties. The protein encoded by this gene, which binds to one of the components of the multiprotein editosome complex, has two repeats of quasi-RRM (RNA recognition motif) domains that bind to RNAs. Two alternatively spliced transcript variants encoding different isoforms have been described for this gene.

== Interactions ==
HNRNPAB has been shown to interact with TP63.
