= SYT9 =

Protein-coding gene in the species Homo sapiens

Identifiers
- Aliases: SYT9, synaptotagmin 9
- External IDs: OMIM: 613528; MGI: 1926373; GeneCards: SYT9

Gene location (Human)
Chr.	Chromosome 11 (human)
Band	11p15.4	Start	7,238,778 bp
Band	11p15.4	End	7,469,043 bp

Gene location (Mouse)
Chr.	Chromosome 7 (mouse)
Band	7|7 E3	Start	106,969,935 bp
Band	7|7 E3	End	107,147,863 bp
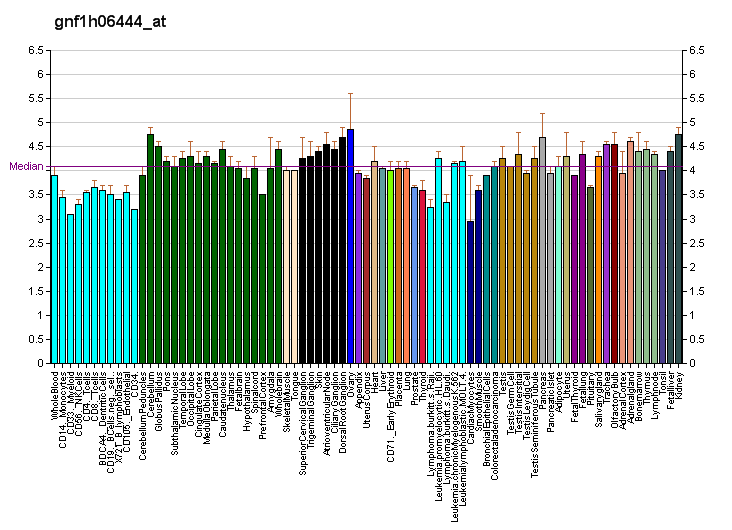
RNA expression pattern
Bgee	Human / Mouse (ortholog); Top expressed in: internal globus pallidus; cerebellar vermis; corpus callosum; lateral nuclear group of thalamus; subthalamic nucleus; cerebellar hemisphere; inferior ganglion of vagus nerve; external globus pallidus; ventral tegmental area; pars reticulata / Top expressed in: habenula; medial dorsal nucleus; lumbar spinal ganglion; medial geniculate nucleus; molar; Epithelium of choroid plexus; lateral geniculate nucleus; lobe of cerebellum; cerebellar vermis; superior cervical ganglion; More reference expression data
BioGPS	More reference expression data
Gene ontology
Molecular function	calcium-dependent phospholipid binding; metal ion binding; clathrin binding; calcium ion binding; syntaxin binding; identical protein binding; phosphatidylserine binding; phosphatidylinositol-4,5-bisphosphate binding; SNARE binding
Cellular component	cytoplasmic vesicle; integral component of membrane; cell junction; synapse; dense core granule; synaptic vesicle membrane; secretory granule membrane; membrane; secretory granule; plasma membrane; clathrin-coated vesicle membrane; integral component of synaptic vesicle membrane; hippocampal mossy fiber to CA3 synapse; exocytic vesicle
Biological process	regulation of insulin secretion; positive regulation of calcium ion-dependent exocytosis; regulation of calcium ion-dependent exocytosis; vesicle fusion; calcium ion-regulated exocytosis of neurotransmitter; membrane organization; calcium-dependent activation of synaptic vesicle fusion; regulation of dopamine secretion; synaptic vesicle exocytosis; vesicle-mediated transport; calcium-ion regulated exocytosis; cellular response to calcium ion
Sources:Amigo / QuickGO
Orthologs
Databases	NCBI: entry; OMA: entry
Species	Human	Mouse
Entrez	143425	60510
Ensembl	ENSG00000170743	ENSMUSG00000062542
UniProt	Q86SS6	Q9R0N9
RefSeq (mRNA)	NM_175733	NM_021889
RefSeq (protein)	NP_783860	NP_068689
Location (UCSC)	Chr 11: 7.24 – 7.47 Mb	Chr 7: 106.97 – 107.15 Mb
PubMed search
- Wikidata
View/Edit Human	View/Edit Mouse

Synaptotagmin-9 is a protein that in humans is encoded by the SYT9 gene.

== Interactions ==
SYT9 has been shown to interact with SYNCRIP, TUBB and TRPV1.
