= SYNCRIP =

Protein-coding gene in the species Homo sapiens

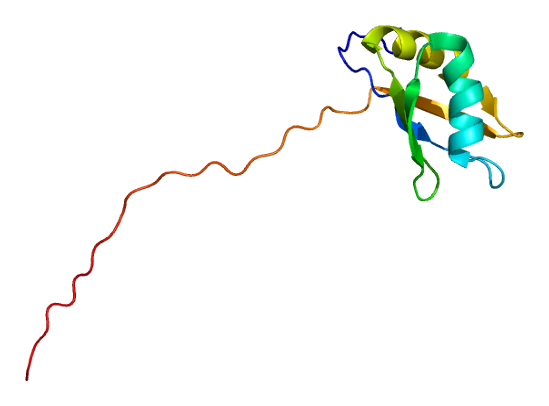

Identifiers
- Aliases: SYNCRIP, GRY-RBP, GRYRBP, HNRNPQ, HNRPQ1, NSAP1, PP68, hnRNP-Q, synaptotagmin binding cytoplasmic RNA interacting protein
- External IDs: OMIM: 616686; MGI: 1891690; GeneCards: SYNCRIP
Available structures
| PDB | Ortholog search: PDBe RCSB |
| PDB | List of PDB id codes 2DGU, 2MXT, 2NBB |

Gene location (Human)
| Chr. | Chromosome 6 (human) |
| Band | 6q14.3 | Start | 85,607,779 bp |
| Band | 6q14.3 | End | 85,644,063 bp |

Gene location (Mouse)
| Chr. | Chromosome 9 (mouse) |
| Band | 9|9 E3.1 | Start | 88,329,062 bp |
| Band | 9|9 E3.1 | End | 88,364,627 bp |
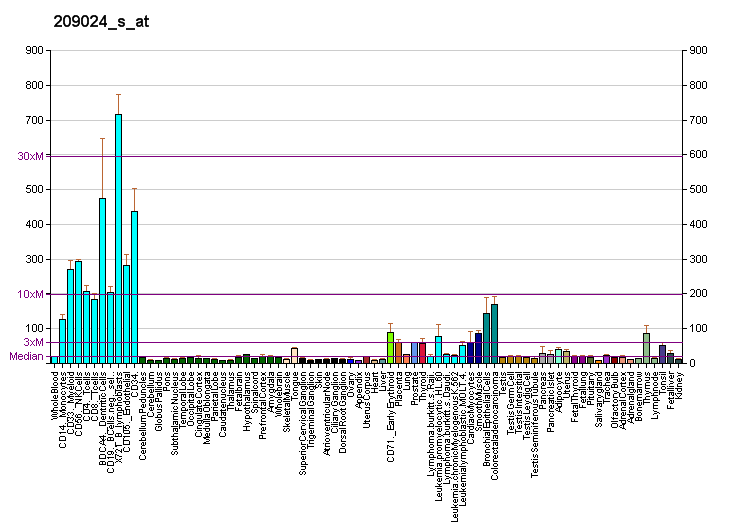

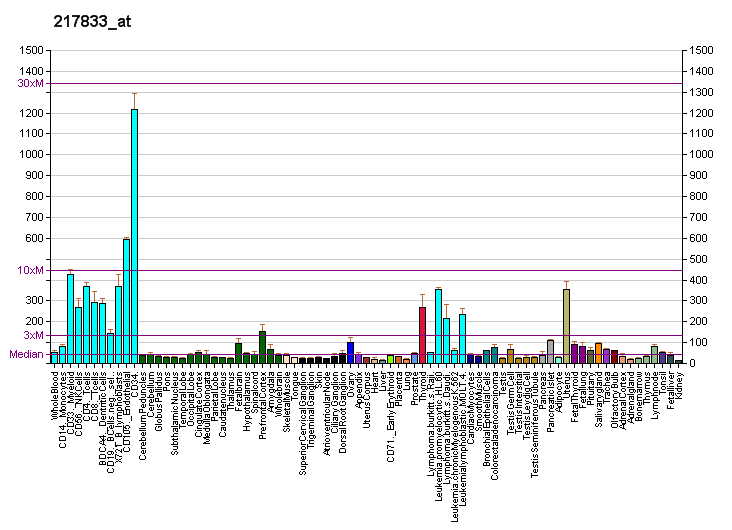

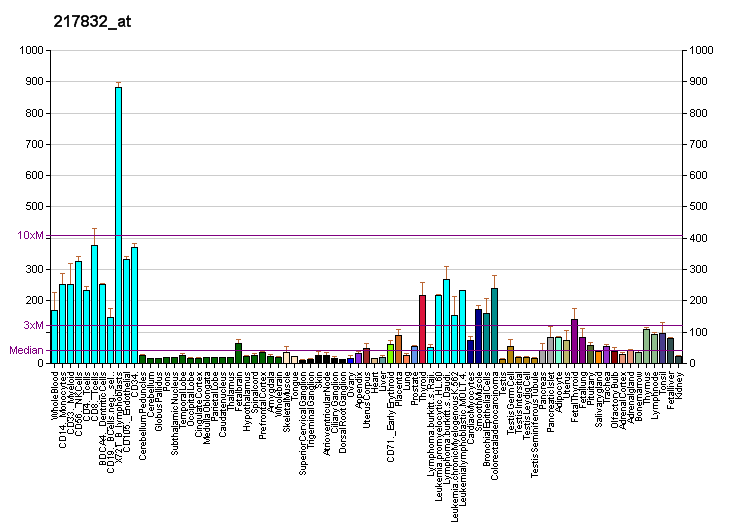
RNA expression pattern
| Bgee | Human / Mouse (ortholog); Top expressed in: ventricular zone; ganglionic eminence; amniotic fluid; skin of thigh; skin of hip; tendon of biceps brachii; sperm; stromal cell of endometrium; secondary oocyte; tail of epididymis / Top expressed in: tail of embryo; ventricular zone; aortic valve; ascending aorta; mandibular prominence; hand; maxillary prominence; epiblast; abdominal wall; ganglionic eminence; More reference expression data |
| BioGPS | More reference expression data |
Gene ontology
| Molecular function | poly(A) binding; protein binding; nucleic acid binding; RNA binding; mRNA binding; mRNA 5'-UTR binding |
| Cellular component | CRD-mediated mRNA stability complex; cytoplasm; catalytic step 2 spliceosome; histone pre-mRNA 3'end processing complex; intracellular membrane-bounded organelle; nucleoplasm; endoplasmic reticulum; GAIT complex; spliceosomal complex; nucleus; membrane; ribonucleoprotein complex |
| Biological process | CRD-mediated mRNA stabilization; mRNA splicing, via spliceosome; RNA processing; negative regulation of translation; mRNA processing; osteoblast differentiation; RNA splicing; cellular response to interferon-gamma; viral process; regulation of translation |
Sources:Amigo / QuickGO
Orthologs
| Databases | NCBI: entry; OMA: entry |
| Species | Human | Mouse |
| Entrez | 10492 | 56403 |
| Ensembl | ENSG00000135316 | ENSMUSG00000032423 |
| UniProt | O60506 | Q7TMK9 |
| RefSeq (mRNA) | NM_001159673; NM_001159674; NM_001159675; NM_001159676; NM_001159677 NM_001253771; NM_006372 | NM_001284328; NM_019666; NM_019796; NM_001311113 |
| RefSeq (protein) | NP_001153145; NP_001153146; NP_001153147; NP_001153148; NP_001153149 NP_001240700; NP_006363 | NP_001271257; NP_001298042; NP_062640; NP_062770 |
| Location (UCSC) | Chr 6: 85.61 – 85.64 Mb | Chr 9: 88.33 – 88.36 Mb |
| PubMed search |
- Wikidata
| View/Edit Human | View/Edit Mouse |

Synaptotagmin-binding, cytoplasmic RNA-interacting protein (SYNCRIP), also known as heterogeneous nuclear ribonucleoprotein (hnRNP) Q or NS1-associated protein-1 (NSAP-1), is a protein that in humans is encoded by the SYNCRIP gene. As the name implies, SYNCRIP is localized predominantly in the cytoplasm. It is evolutionarily conserved across eukaryotes and participates in several cellular and disease pathways, especially in neuronal and muscular development. In humans, there are three isoforms, all of which are associated in vitro with pre-mRNAs, mRNA splicing intermediates, and mature mRNA-protein complexes, including mRNA turnover.

== Structure and function ==
This gene belongs to the subfamily of ubiquitously expressed heterogeneous nuclear ribonucleoproteins (hnRNPs). The hnRNPs are RNA-binding proteins and they complex with heterogeneous nuclear RNA (hnRNA).

SYNCRIP is made up of an N-terminal helix bundle known as the “acidic domain” (AcD), followed by three sequential RNA recognition motifs (RRMs) separated by short linkers, and an arginine-glycine-rich domain called the "RGG box" at the C-terminus. The RRMs play a role in RNA binding, while the AcD engages in protein-protein interactions (PPIs). The RGG box is involved in both RNA binding and in PPIs. The AcD is unique to SYNCRIP and its nuclear homolog hnRNP R, and is involved in interactions with APOBEC-1. It is a self-folding, all-helical domain of five α-helices, containing a large hydrophobic cavity and a positively charged surface area as potential interaction sites in addition to negatively charged surface areas, with no structural homologs in any other known proteins. The hydrophobic core is mostly made up of leucine residues, while the surface is made up of 15 acidic residues and 13 basic residues which together form a vast interaction network. The AcD is linked to RRM1 by a unique α-β-β unit, creating an “extended RRM fold” mediated primarily by hydrophobic interactions. The RGG box is an unstructured region containing numerous Arg-Gly-Gly repeats with fairly regular spacing. There are eight such repeats in SYNCRIP. This domain can bind proteins and RNA independently, even if the other binding domains are not present. Although this domain is rich in arginine content, it does not have any arginine-rich clusters as might be observed in usual arginine-rich RBPs.

Isoform 1 is a component of the apolipoprotein B (apoB) mRNA editosome complex, and it modulates the post-transcriptional C-to-U RNA editing of apoB mRNA through binding either to the apoB mRNA-editing enzyme catalytic peptide 1 (APOBEC-1), to the APOBEC-1 complementation factor (ACF), or directly to RNA itself. Isoform 1 is also implicated with other RBPs in the cytoplasmic de-adenylation and translational and decay interplay of c-Fos mRNA mediated by the major coding-region determinant of instability (mCRD) domain.

The function of isoform 2 is not as clearly understood.

Isoform 3 is involved in cytoplasmic vesicle-based mRNA transport through interaction with synaptotagmins (SYTs). This isoform is also a component of the gamma interferon (IFNγ)-activated inhibitor of translation (GAIT) complex in humans, which mediates IFNγ-induced transcript-selective translation inhibition in inflammation processes. Upon IFN-γ activation, SYNCRIP assembles into the GAIT complex, which binds to stem-loop-containing GAIT elements in the 3’-untranslated region (3’- UTR) of diverse inflammatory mRNAs and suppresses their translation, but this seems to not be essential for the overall function of the GAIT complex.

== Interactions ==
SYNCRIP has been shown to interact with ACF, APOBEC1, SYT7, and SYT9.
