= GAIT element =

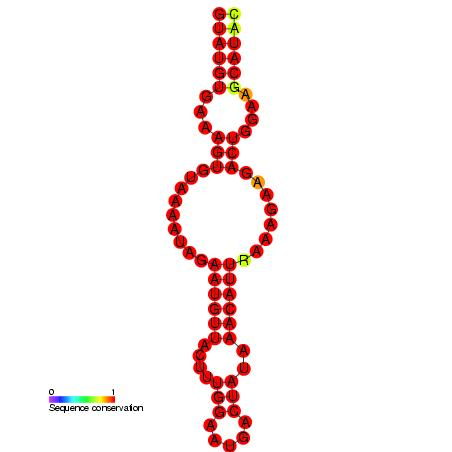
- Predicted secondary structure and sequence conservation of GAIT

Identifiers
- Symbol: GAIT
- Rfam: RF00179

Other data
- RNA type: Cis-reg
- Domain: Eukaryota
- SO: SO:0000233
- PDB structures: PDBe

The gamma interferon inhibitor of translation element or GAIT element is a cis-acting RNA element located in the 3'-UTR of the ceruloplasmin (Cp) mRNA.

The GAIT element forms a stem-loop secondary structure. The GAIT element is involved in selective translational silencing of the Cp transcript within monocytic cells, but not hepatic cells. Cp is a multifunctional, copper-containing glycoprotein produced by the liver and secreted into the plasma for its role in copper and iron homeostasis. Ceruloplasmin is also an acute-phase protein produced by monocytes, and its plasma concentration can double during multiple inflammatory conditions through increased Cp production by monocytic cells after stimulation by interferon gamma (IFNγ). Plasma Cp has been reported to be an independent risk factor for cardiovascular disease, including atherosclerosis, carotid restenosis after endarterectomy, and myocardial infarction. Translational silencing of Cp, and possibly other transcripts, mediated by the GAIT element may contribute to the resolution of the local inflammatory response following cytokine activation of macrophages.

The silencing of Cp protein translation in IFN-gamma-stimulated monocytes is accomplished by binding of the IFN-gamma-activated inhibitor of translation (GAIT) inhibitor complex to the GAIT element. The GAIT complex consists of the proteins ribosomal protein L13a, glutamyl-prolyl-tRNA synthetase, NS1-associated protein-1, and glyceraldehyde 3-phosphate dehydrogenase.
