= Heterogeneous ribonucleoprotein particle =

Macromolecular complex containing protein and RNA molecules

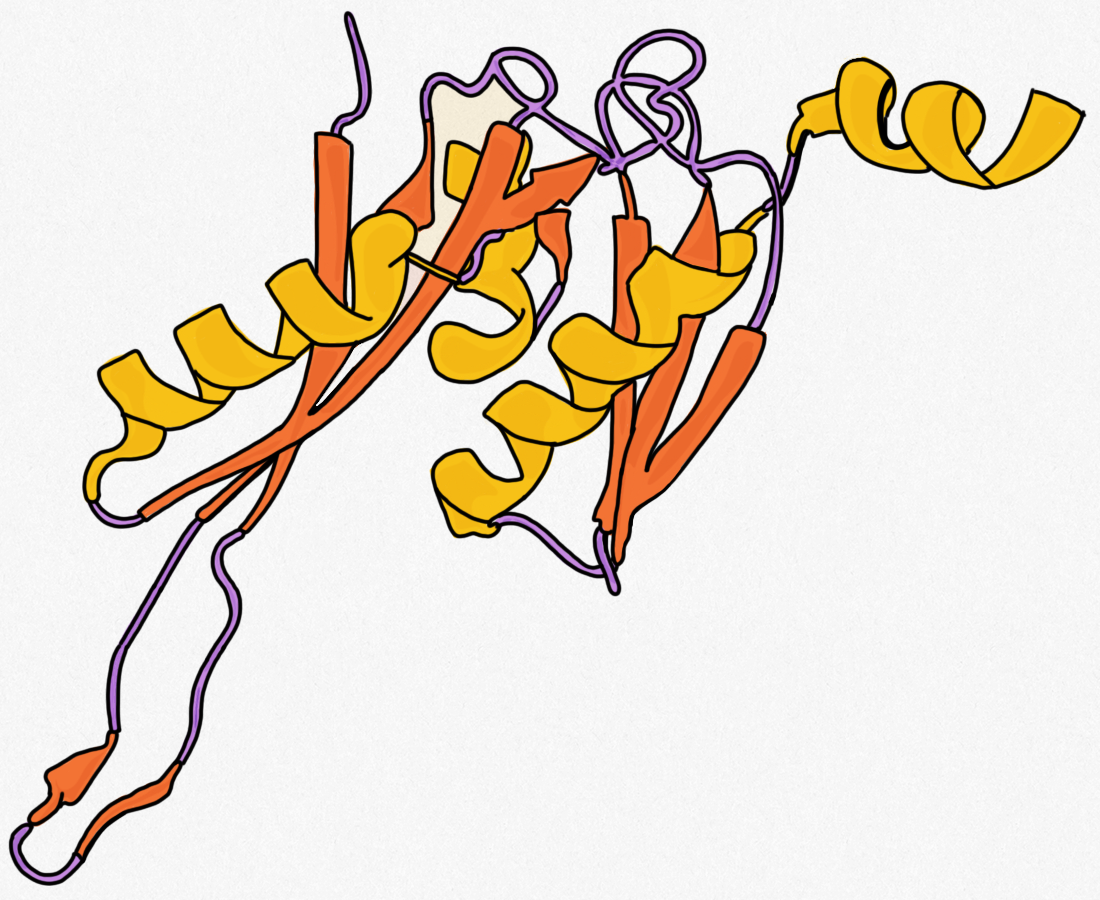

Heterogeneous nuclear ribonucleoproteins (hnRNPs) are complexes of RNA and protein present in the cell nucleus during gene transcription and subsequent post-transcriptional modification of the newly synthesized RNA (pre-mRNA). The presence of the proteins bound to a pre-mRNA molecule serves as a signal that the pre-mRNA is not yet fully processed and therefore not ready for export to the cytoplasm. Since most mature RNA is exported from the nucleus relatively quickly, most RNA-binding protein in the nucleus exist as heterogeneous ribonucleoprotein particles. After splicing has occurred, the proteins remain bound to spliced introns and target them for degradation.

hnRNPs are also integral to the 40S subunit of the ribosome and therefore important for the translation of mRNA in the cytoplasm. However, hnRNPs also have their own nuclear localization sequences (NLS) and are therefore found mainly in the nucleus. Though it is known that a few hnRNPs shuttle between the cytoplasm and nucleus, immunofluorescence microscopy with hnRNP-specific antibodies shows nucleoplasmic localization of these proteins with little staining in the nucleolus or cytoplasm. This is likely because of its major role in binding to newly transcribed RNAs. High-resolution immunoelectron microscopy has shown that hnRNPs localize predominantly to the border regions of chromatin, where it has access to these nascent RNAs.

The proteins involved in the hnRNP complexes are collectively known as heterogeneous ribonucleoproteins. They include protein K and polypyrimidine tract-binding protein (PTB), which is regulated by phosphorylation catalyzed by protein kinase A and is responsible for suppressing RNA splicing at a particular exon by blocking access of the spliceosome to the polypyrimidine tract. hnRNPs are also responsible for strengthening and inhibiting splice sites by making such sites more or less accessible to the spliceosome. Cooperative interactions between attached hnRNPs may encourage certain splicing combinations while inhibiting others.

== Role in cell cycle and DNA damage ==
hnRNPs affect several aspects of the cell cycle by recruiting, splicing, and co-regulating certain cell cycle control proteins. Much of hnRNPs' importance to cell cycle control is evidenced by its role as an oncogene, in which a loss of its functions results in various common cancers. Often, misregulation by hnRNPs is due to splicing errors, but some hnRNPs are also responsible for recruiting and guiding the proteins themselves, rather than just addressing nascent RNAs.

=== BRCA1 ===
hnRNP C is a key regulator of the BRCA1 and BRCA2 genes. In response to ionizing radiation, hnRNP C partially localizes to the site of DNA damage, and when depleted, S-phase progression of the cell is impaired. Additionally, BRCA1 and BRCA2 levels fall when hnRNP C is lost. BRCA1 and BRCA2 are crucial tumor-suppressor genes which are strongly implicated in breast cancers when mutated. BRCA1 in particular causes G2/M cell cycle arrest in response to DNA damage via the CHEK1 signaling cascade. hnRNP C is important for the proper expression of other tumor suppressor genes including RAD51 and BRIP1 as well. Through these genes, hnRNP is necessary to induce cell-cycle arrest in response to DNA damage by ionizing radiation.

=== HER2 ===
HER2 is overexpressed in 20-30% of breast cancers and is commonly associated with poor prognosis. It is therefore an oncogene whose differently spliced variants have been shown to have different functions. Knocking down hnRNP H1 was shown to increase the amount of an oncogenic variant Δ16HER2. HER2 is an upstream regulator of cyclin D1 and p27, and its overexpression leads to the deregulation of the G1/S checkpoint.

=== p53 ===
hnRNPs also play a role in DNA damage response in coordination with p53. hnRNP K is rapidly induced after DNA damage by ionizing radiation. It cooperates with p53 to induce the activation of p53 target genes, thus activating cell-cycle checkpoints. p53 itself is an important tumor-suppressor gene sometimes known by the epithet "the guardian of the genome." hnRNP K's close association with p53 demonstrates its importance in DNA damage control.

p53 regulates a large group of RNAs that are not translated into protein, called large intergenic noncoding RNAs (lincRNAs). p53 suppression of genes is often carried out by a number of these lincRNAs, which in turn have been shown to act though hnRNP K. Through physical interactions with these molecules, hnRNP K is targeted to genes and transmits p53 regulation, thus acting as a key repressor within the p53-dependent transcriptional pathway.

== Functions ==
hnRNP serves a variety of processes in the cell, some of which include:

1. Preventing the folding of pre-mRNA into secondary structures that may inhibit its interactions with other proteins.
2. Possible association with the splicing apparatus.
3. Transport of mRNA out of the nucleus.

The association of a pre-mRNA molecule with a hnRNP particle prevents formation of short secondary structures dependent on base pairing of complementary regions, thereby making the pre-mRNA accessible for interactions with other proteins.

=== CD44 Regulation ===
hnRNP has been shown to regulate CD44, a cell-surface glycoprotein, through splicing mechanisms. CD44 is involved in cell-cell interactions and has roles in cell adhesion and migration. Splicing of CD44 and the functions of the resulting isoforms are different in breast cancer cells, and when knocked down, hnRNP reduced both cell viability and invasiveness.

=== Telomeres ===
Several hnRNPs interact with telomeres, which protect the ends of chromosomes from deterioration and are often associated with cell longevity. hnRNP D associates with the G-rich repeat region of the telomeres, possibly stabilizing the region from secondary structures which would inhibit telomere replication.

hnRNP has also been shown to interact with telomerase, the protein responsible for elongating telomeres and prevent their degradation. hnRNPs C1 and C2 associate with the RNA component of telomerase, which improves its ability to access the telomere.

== Examples ==
Human genes encoding heterogeneous nuclear ribonucleoproteins include:

- HNRNPA0, HNRNPA1, HNRNPA1L1, HNRNPA1L2, HNRNPA3, HNRNPA2B1
- HNRNPAB
- HNRNPB1
- HNRNPC, HNRNPCL1
- HNRNPD (AUF1), HNRPDL
- HNRNPF
- HNRNPG (RBMX)
- HNRNPH1, HNRNPH2, HNRNPH3
- HNRNPI (PTB)
- HNRNPK
- HNRNPL, HNRPLL
- HNRNPM
- HNRNPP2 (FUS/TLS)
- HNRNPR
- HNRNPQ (SYNCRIP)
- HNRNPU, HNRNPUL1, HNRNPUL2, HNRNPUL3
- FMR1

== See also ==
- Messenger RNP: complex between mRNA and protein(s) present in nucleus
