= BAG4 =

Protein-coding gene in the species Homo sapiens

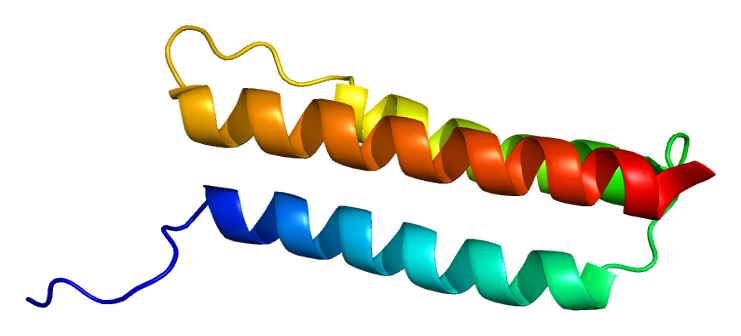

Identifiers
- Aliases: BAG4, BAG-4, SODD, BCL2 associated athanogene 4, BAG cochaperone 4
- External IDs: OMIM: 603884; MGI: 1914634; GeneCards: BAG4
Available structures
PDB	Ortholog search: PDBe RCSB
PDB	List of PDB id codes 1M62, 1M7K

Gene location (Human)
Chr.	Chromosome 8 (human)
Band	8p11.23	Start	38,176,533 bp
Band	8p11.23	End	38,213,301 bp

Gene location (Mouse)
Chr.	Chromosome 8 (mouse)
Band	8|8 A2	Start	26,254,566 bp
Band	8|8 A2	End	26,275,315 bp
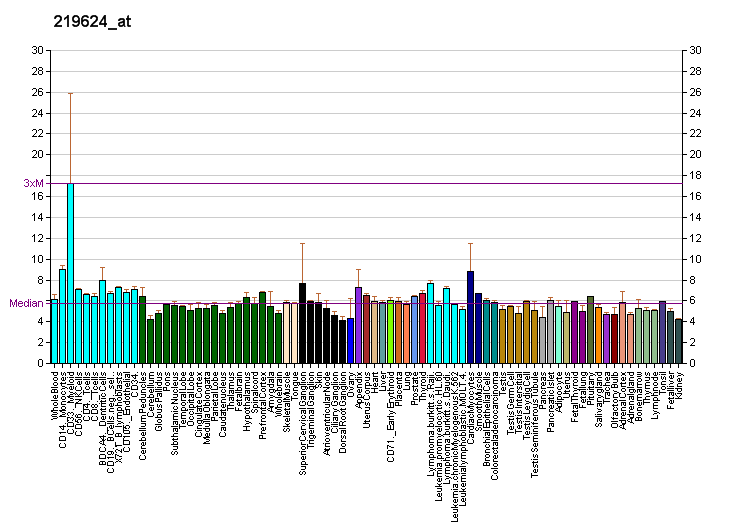
RNA expression pattern
Bgee	Human / Mouse (ortholog); Top expressed in: Brodmann area 23; lateral nuclear group of thalamus; postcentral gyrus; germinal epithelium; pons; entorhinal cortex; epithelium of nasopharynx; superior frontal gyrus; pars compacta; cerebellar vermis / Top expressed in: primary oocyte; dentate gyrus of hippocampal formation granule cell; zygote; Region I of hippocampus proper; seminiferous tubule; visual cortex; lateral septal nucleus; retinal pigment epithelium; ventromedial nucleus; primary visual cortex; More reference expression data
BioGPS	More reference expression data
Gene ontology
Molecular function	chaperone binding; ubiquitin protein ligase binding; protein binding; adenyl-nucleotide exchange factor activity; RNA binding
Cellular component	cytoplasm; plasma membrane; cytosol; nucleus
Biological process	positive regulation of peptidyl-serine phosphorylation; positive regulation of fibroblast migration; negative regulation of apoptotic process; negative regulation of protein targeting to mitochondrion; cellular response to epidermal growth factor stimulus; positive regulation of protein kinase B signaling; negative regulation of phosphatidylinositol-3,4,5-trisphosphate 5-phosphatase activity; positive regulation of stress fiber assembly; protein folding; tumor necrosis factor-mediated signaling pathway; positive regulation of actin filament polymerization; protein localization to plasma membrane; ruffle assembly; positive regulation of cell adhesion; regulation of cellular response to heat; cellular response to tumor necrosis factor; negative regulation of mRNA modification; protein heterooligomerization
Sources:Amigo / QuickGO
Orthologs
Databases	NCBI: entry; OMA: entry
Species	Human	Mouse
Entrez	9530	67384
Ensembl	ENSG00000156735	ENSMUSG00000037316
UniProt	O95429	Q8CI61
RefSeq (mRNA)	NM_004874; NM_001204878	NM_026121
RefSeq (protein)	NP_001191807; NP_004865	NP_080397
Location (UCSC)	Chr 8: 38.18 – 38.21 Mb	Chr 8: 26.25 – 26.28 Mb
PubMed search
- Wikidata
View/Edit Human	View/Edit Mouse

BAG family molecular chaperone regulator 4 is a protein that in humans is encoded by the BAG4 gene.

== Function ==
The protein encoded by this gene is a member of the BAG1-related protein family. BAG1 is an anti-apoptotic protein that functions through interactions with a variety of cell apoptosis and growth related proteins including BCL-2, Raf-protein kinase, steroid hormone receptors, growth factor receptors and members of the heat shock protein 70 kDa family. This protein contains a BAG domain near the C-terminus, which could bind and inhibit the chaperone activity of Hsc70/Hsp70. This protein was found to be associated with the death domain of tumor necrosis factor receptor type 1 (TNF-R1) and death receptor-3 (DR3), and thereby negatively regulates downstream cell death signaling. The regulatory role of this protein in cell death was demonstrated in epithelial cells which undergo apoptosis while integrin mediated matrix contacts are lost.

== Interactions ==
BAG4 has been shown to interact with:

- APOBEC1,
- HSPA8, and
- TNFRSF1A.
