= HNRPF =

Protein-coding gene in the species Homo sapiens

HNRNPF
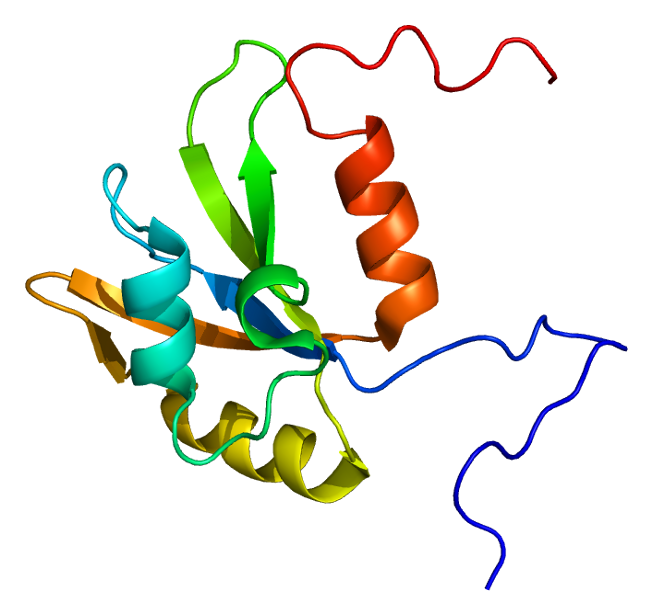

Identifiers
- Aliases: HNRNPF, HNRPF, OK/SW-cl.23, mcs94-1, heterogeneous nuclear ribonucleoprotein F
- External IDs: OMIM: 601037; MGI: 2138741; GeneCards: HNRNPF
Available structures
PDB	Ortholog search: PDBe RCSB
PDB	List of PDB id codes 2HGL, 2HGM, 2HGN, 2KFY, 2KG0, 2KG1, 3TFY

Gene location (Human)
Chr.	Chromosome 10 (human)
Band	10q11.21	Start	43,385,617 bp
Band	10q11.21	End	43,409,186 bp

Gene location (Mouse)
Chr.	Chromosome 6 (mouse)
Band	6|6 F1	Start	117,877,285 bp
Band	6|6 F1	End	117,902,583 bp
RNA expression pattern
Bgee	Human / Mouse (ortholog); Top expressed in: ventricular zone; ganglionic eminence; rectum; gallbladder; olfactory zone of nasal mucosa; monocyte; islet of Langerhans; right uterine tube; gonad; granulocyte / Top expressed in: epiblast; thymus; ventricular zone; tail of embryo; genital tubercle; ovary; uterus; lung; lens; intestine; More reference expression data
BioGPS	n/a
Gene ontology
Molecular function	TBP-class protein binding; transcription factor binding; protein binding; single-stranded RNA binding; nucleic acid binding; RNA binding
Cellular component	catalytic step 2 spliceosome; spliceosomal complex; membrane; nucleus; nucleoplasm; cytosol; plasma membrane
Biological process	mRNA splicing, via spliceosome; regulation of RNA splicing; mRNA processing; RNA processing; fibroblast growth factor receptor signaling pathway; RNA splicing; RNA metabolic process; interleukin-12-mediated signaling pathway
Sources:Amigo / QuickGO
Orthologs
Databases	NCBI: entry; OMA: entry
Species	Human	Mouse
Entrez	3185	98758
Ensembl	ENSG00000169813	ENSMUSG00000042079
UniProt	P52597	Q9Z2X1
RefSeq (mRNA)	NM_004966; NM_001098204; NM_001098205; NM_001098206; NM_001098207 NM_001098208	NM_001166427; NM_001166428; NM_001166429; NM_001166430; NM_001166431 NM_001166432; NM_133834
RefSeq (protein)	NP_001091674; NP_001091675; NP_001091676; NP_001091677; NP_001091678 NP_004957	NP_001159899; NP_001159900; NP_001159901; NP_001159902; NP_001159903 NP_001159904; NP_598595
Location (UCSC)	Chr 10: 43.39 – 43.41 Mb	Chr 6: 117.88 – 117.9 Mb
PubMed search
- Wikidata
View/Edit Human	View/Edit Mouse

Heterogeneous nuclear ribonucleoprotein F is a protein that in humans is encoded by the HNRNPF gene.

This gene belongs to the subfamily of ubiquitously expressed heterogeneous nuclear ribonucleoproteins (hnRNPs). The hnRNPs are RNA binding proteins that complex with heterogeneous nuclear RNA (hnRNA). These proteins are associated with pre-mRNAs in the nucleus and regulate alternative splicing, polyadenylation, and other aspects of mRNA metabolism and transport.

While all of the hnRNPs are present in the nucleus, some seem to shuttle between the nucleus and the cytoplasm. The hnRNP proteins have distinct nucleic acid binding properties. The protein encoded by this gene has three repeats of quasi-RRM domains that bind to RNAs which have guanosine-rich sequences. This protein is very similar to the family member hnRNPH. Multiple alternatively spliced variants, encoding the same protein, have been identified.
