= HNRNPC =

Protein-coding gene in the species Homo sapiens

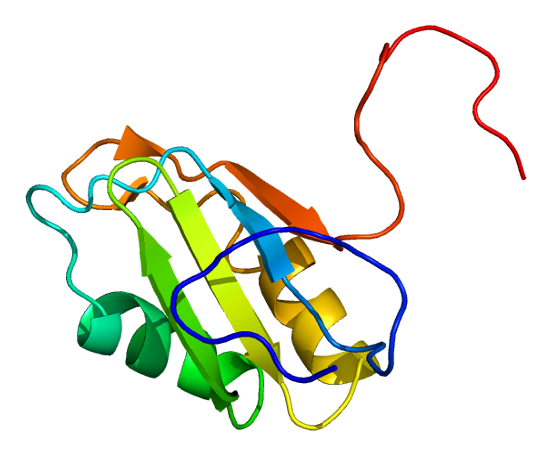

Identifiers
- Aliases: HNRNPC, C1, C2, HNRNP, HNRPC, SNRPC, heterogeneous nuclear ribonucleoprotein C (C1/C2), heterogeneous nuclear ribonucleoprotein C
- External IDs: OMIM: 164020; MGI: 107795; GeneCards: HNRNPC
Available structures
PDB	Ortholog search: PDBe RCSB
PDB	List of PDB id codes 1TXP, 1WF2, 2MXY, 2MZ1, 3LN4

Gene location (Human)
Chr.	Chromosome 14 (human)
Band	14q11.2	Start	21,209,136 bp
Band	14q11.2	End	21,269,494 bp

Gene location (Mouse)
Chr.	Chromosome 14 (mouse)
Band	14 C2|14 26.79 cM	Start	52,310,834 bp
Band	14 C2|14 26.79 cM	End	52,341,485 bp
RNA expression pattern
Bgee	Human / Mouse (ortholog); Top expressed in: ventricular zone; ganglionic eminence; Achilles tendon; monocyte; left ovary; smooth muscle tissue; right uterine tube; epithelium of colon; right ovary; appendix / Top expressed in: primitive streak; condyle; medial ganglionic eminence; fossa; abdominal wall; internal carotid artery; external carotid artery; renal corpuscle; endothelial cell of lymphatic vessel; migratory enteric neural crest cell; More reference expression data
BioGPS	n/a
Gene ontology
Molecular function	RNA polymerase II cis-regulatory region sequence-specific DNA binding; N6-methyladenosine-containing RNA binding; poly(U) RNA binding; mRNA 3'-UTR binding; protein binding; identical protein binding; nucleosomal DNA binding; nucleic acid binding; telomerase RNA binding; RNA binding
Cellular component	cytosol; catalytic step 2 spliceosome; membrane; nucleoplasm; telomerase holoenzyme complex; extracellular exosome; spliceosomal complex; nucleus; actin cytoskeleton; extracellular region; protein-containing complex
Biological process	negative regulation of telomere maintenance via telomerase; mRNA processing; osteoblast differentiation; 3'-UTR-mediated mRNA stabilization; mRNA splicing, via spliceosome; RNA splicing; RNA metabolic process
Sources:Amigo / QuickGO
Orthologs
Databases	NCBI: entry; OMA: entry
Species	Human	Mouse
Entrez	3183	15381
Ensembl	ENSG00000092199	ENSMUSG00000060373
UniProt	P07910	Q9Z204
RefSeq (mRNA)	NM_001077442; NM_001077443; NM_004500; NM_031314	NM_001170981; NM_001170982; NM_001170983; NM_001170984; NM_016884 NM_001360172; NM_001360173; NM_001360174; NM_001360175; NM_001360176; NM_001360177; NM_001360178; NM_001360179; NM_001360180; NM_001360181; NM_001360182; NM_001360183; NM_001360184
RefSeq (protein)	NP_001070910; NP_001070911; NP_004491; NP_112604	NP_001164452; NP_001164453; NP_001164454; NP_001164455; NP_058580 NP_001347101; NP_001347102; NP_001347103; NP_001347104; NP_001347105; NP_001347106; NP_001347107; NP_001347108; NP_001347109; NP_001347110; NP_001347111; NP_001347112; NP_001347113
Location (UCSC)	Chr 14: 21.21 – 21.27 Mb	Chr 14: 52.31 – 52.34 Mb
PubMed search
- Wikidata
View/Edit Human	View/Edit Mouse

Heterogeneous nuclear ribonucleoproteins C1/C2 is a protein that in humans is encoded by the HNRNPC gene.

It is abnormally expressed in fetuses of both IVF and ICSI, which may contribute to the increase risk of birth defects in these ART.

== Function ==
This gene belongs to the subfamily of ubiquitously expressed heterogeneous nuclear ribonucleoproteins (hnRNPs). The hnRNPs are RNA binding proteins and they complex with heterogeneous nuclear RNA (hnRNA). These proteins are associated with pre-mRNAs in the nucleus and appear to influence pre-mRNA processing(reference: Koenig J. nature structural and Molecular Biology 2010: iCLIP) and other aspects of mRNA metabolism and transport. While all of the hnRNPs are present in the nucleus, some seem to shuttle between the nucleus and the cytoplasm. The hnRNP proteins have distinct nucleic acid binding properties. Transcriptional regulation by hormonal 1,25-dihydroxyvitamin D(3) (calcitriol) involves occupancy of vitamin D response elements (VDREs) by HNRNPC or 1,25(OH)(2)D(3)-bound vitamin D receptor (VDR). This relationship is disrupted by elevated HNRNPC, causing a form of hereditary vitamin D-resistant rickets (HVDRR) in both humans and non-human primates. The protein encoded by this gene can act as a tetramer and is involved in the assembly of 40S hnRNP particles. Species-specific tetramerization of HNRNPC subunits is important to its nucleic acid binding, whereby over-expression of major human HNRNPC subunits in mouse osteoblastic cells confers vitamin D resistance. Multiple transcript variants encoding at least two different isoforms have been described for this gene.

== Interactions ==
HNRNPC has been shown to interact with Grb2.
