= Apolipoprotein B (apoB) 5′ UTR cis-regulatory element =

RNA element

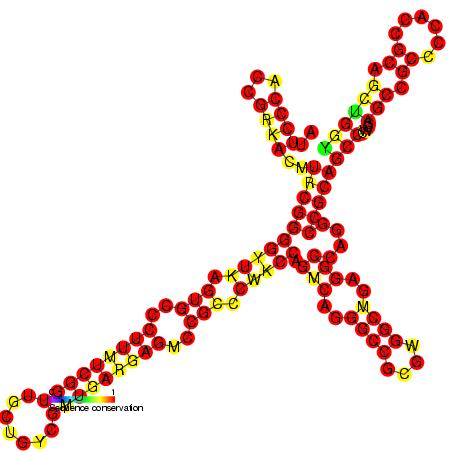
- Predicted secondary structure and sequence conservation of ApoB_5_CRE

Identifiers
- Symbol: ApoB_5_CRE
- Rfam: RF00463

Other data
- RNA type: Cis-reg
- Domain(s): Eukaryota
- SO: SO:0000204
- PDB structures: PDBe

The apolipoprotein B (apoB) 5′ UTR cis regulatory element is an RNA element located in the 5′ UTR of the human apoB mRNA. This structured element increases translation of the apoB protein or a reporter gene.
