= CELF2 =

Protein-coding gene in humans

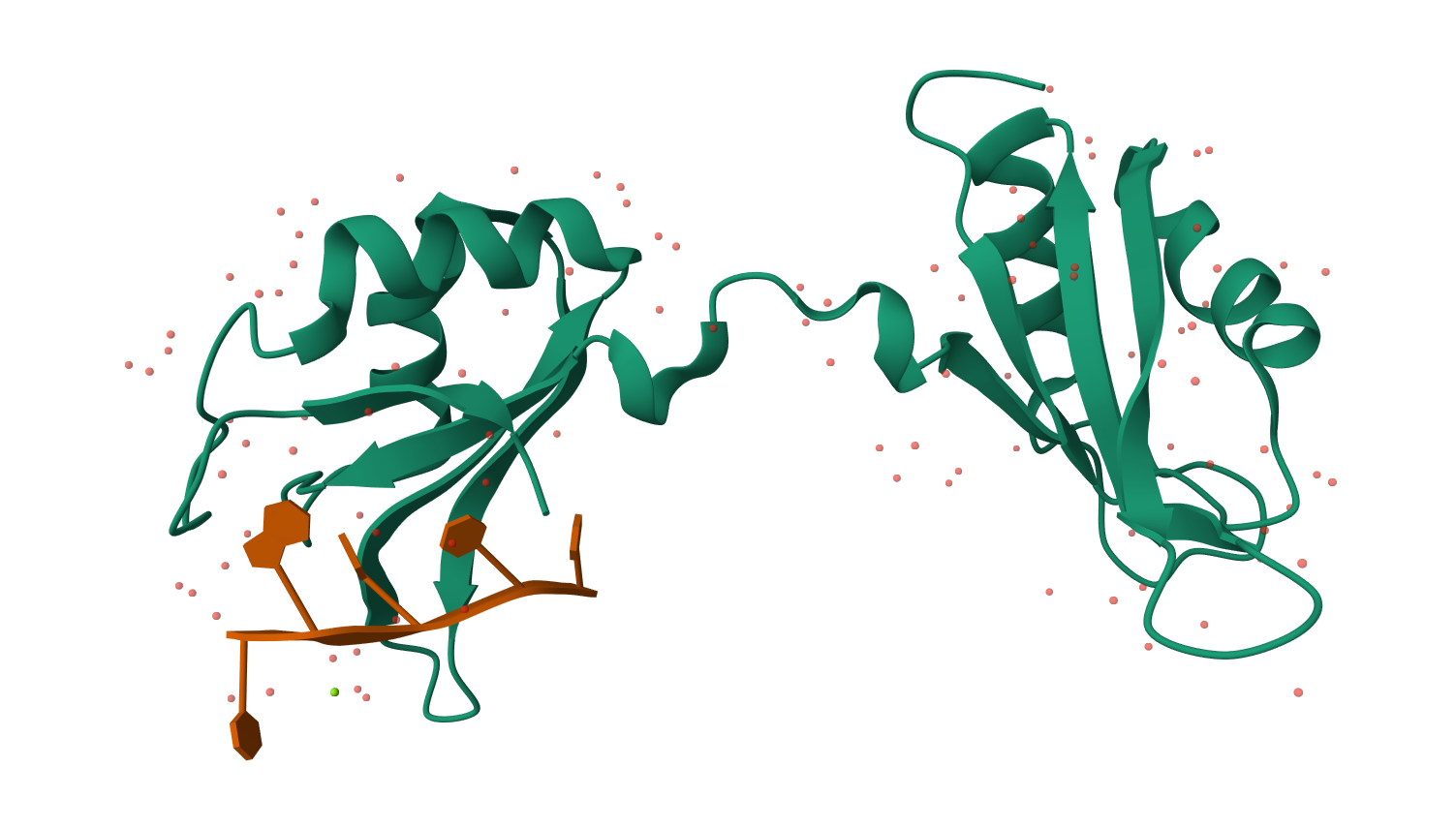

Identifiers
- Aliases: CELF2, BRUNOL3, CUGBP2, ETR-3, ETR3, NAPOR, CELF-2, CUG-BP2, CUGBP, Elav-like family member 2, CUGBP Elav-like family member 2, DEE97
- External IDs: OMIM: 602538; MGI: 1338822; GeneCards: CELF2
Available structures
PDB	Ortholog search: PDBe RCSB
PDB	List of PDB id codes 2MY7, 2MY8, 4LJM, 4LMZ, 4TLQ

Gene location (Human)
Chr.	Chromosome 10 (human)
Band	10p14	Start	10,798,397 bp
Band	10p14	End	11,336,675 bp

Gene location (Mouse)
Chr.	Chromosome 2 (mouse)
Band	2|2 A1	Start	6,539,694 bp
Band	2|2 A1	End	7,509,563 bp
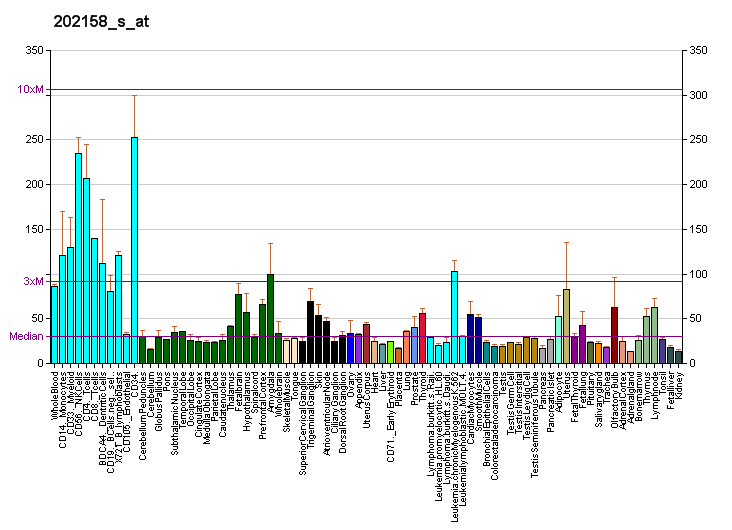

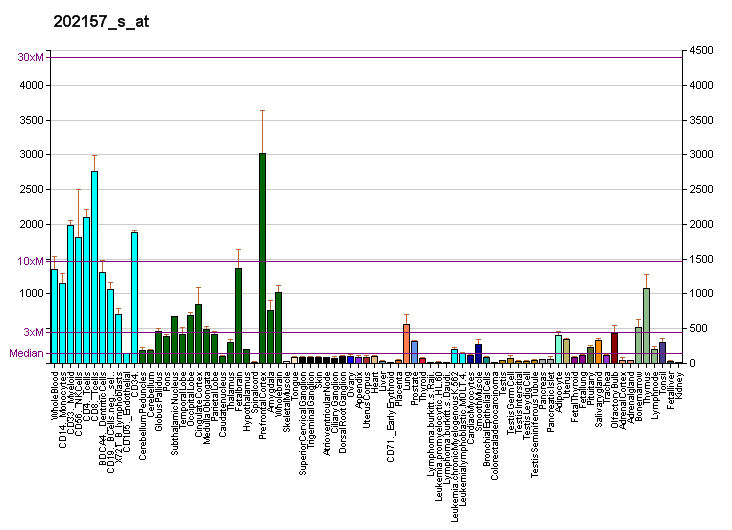

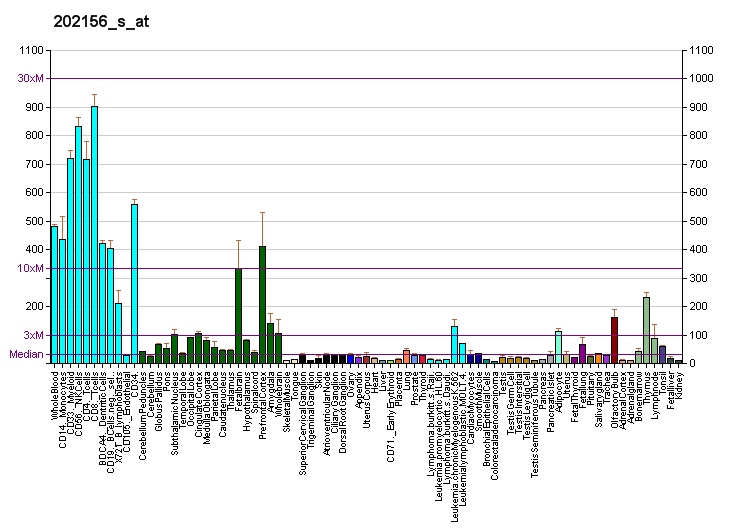
RNA expression pattern
Bgee	Human / Mouse (ortholog); Top expressed in: Region I of hippocampus proper; orbitofrontal cortex; entorhinal cortex; trabecular bone; middle temporal gyrus; postcentral gyrus; Brodmann area 46; lateral nuclear group of thalamus; Brodmann area 23; germinal epithelium / Top expressed in: Rostral migratory stream; lateral septal nucleus; olfactory tubercle; nucleus accumbens; anterior amygdaloid area; subiculum; barrel cortex; ganglionic eminence; olfactory bulb; medial dorsal nucleus; More reference expression data
BioGPS	More reference expression data
Gene ontology
Molecular function	nucleic acid binding; RNA binding; pre-mRNA binding; mRNA binding
Cellular component	cytoplasm; nucleus; ribonucleoprotein complex
Biological process	mRNA processing; RNA processing; regulation of heart contraction; mRNA splice site selection; regulation of alternative mRNA splicing, via spliceosome
Sources:Amigo / QuickGO
Orthologs
Databases	NCBI: entry; OMA: entry
Species	Human	Mouse
Entrez	10659	14007
Ensembl	ENSG00000048740	ENSMUSG00000002107
UniProt	O95319	Q9Z0H4
RefSeq (mRNA)	NM_001025076; NM_001025077; NM_001083591; NM_006561; NM_001326317 NM_001326318; NM_001326319; NM_001326320; NM_001326321; NM_001326323; NM_001326324; NM_001326325; NM_001326326; NM_001326327; NM_001326328; NM_001326329; NM_001326330; NM_001326331; NM_001326332; NM_001326333; NM_001326334; NM_001326335; NM_001326336; NM_001326337; NM_001326338; NM_001326339; NM_001326340; NM_001326341; NM_001326342; NM_001326343; NM_001326344; NM_001326345; NM_001326346; NM_001326347; NM_001326348; NM_001326349; NM_001394502; NM_001394513; NM_001394517; NM_001394518; NM_001394519	NM_001110228; NM_001110229; NM_001110230; NM_001110231; NM_001110232 NM_001160292; NM_001160293; NM_010160; NM_183219; NM_001310447; NM_001347094
RefSeq (protein)	NP_001020247; NP_001020248; NP_001077060; NP_001313246; NP_001313247 NP_001313248; NP_001313249; NP_001313250; NP_001313252; NP_001313253; NP_001313254; NP_001313255; NP_001313256; NP_001313257; NP_001313258; NP_001313259; NP_001313260; NP_001313261; NP_001313262; NP_001313263; NP_001313264; NP_001313265; NP_001313266; NP_001313267; NP_001313268; NP_001313269; NP_001313270; NP_001313271; NP_001313272; NP_001313273; NP_001313274; NP_001313275; NP_001313276; NP_001313277; NP_001313278; NP_006552	NP_001103698; NP_001103699; NP_001103700; NP_001103701; NP_001103702 NP_001153764; NP_001153765; NP_001297376; NP_001334023; NP_034290; NP_001393762; NP_001393763; NP_001393764; NP_001393770; NP_001393771; NP_001393772; NP_001393773; NP_001393774; NP_001393775; NP_001393776; NP_001393777; NP_001393778; NP_001393779; NP_001393780; NP_001393781; NP_001393783; NP_001393784; NP_001393787; NP_001393846; NP_001393847; NP_001393848; NP_001393849; NP_001393850; NP_001393851; NP_001393852; NP_001393853; NP_001393854; NP_001393855; NP_001393856; NP_001393857; NP_001393858; NP_001393859; NP_001393860; NP_001393861; NP_001393862; NP_001393863; NP_001393871; NP_001393872; NP_001393873; NP_001393874; NP_001393875; NP_001393876; NP_001393877; NP_001393878; NP_001393879; NP_001393880; NP_001393881; NP_001393882; NP_001393883; NP_001393884; NP_001393885; NP_001393886; NP_001393887; NP_001393888; NP_001393889; NP_001393890; NP_001393891; NP_001393892; NP_001393893; NP_001393894; NP_001393895; NP_001393896; NP_001393897; NP_001393898; NP_001393899; NP_001393900; NP_001393901; NP_001393902; NP_001393903; NP_001393904; NP_001393905; NP_001393906; NP_001393907; NP_001393908; NP_001393909; NP_001393910; NP_001393911
Location (UCSC)	Chr 10: 10.8 – 11.34 Mb	Chr 2: 6.54 – 7.51 Mb
PubMed search
- Wikidata
View/Edit Human	View/Edit Mouse

CUGBP Elav-like family member 2, also known as Etr-3, is a protein that in humans is encoded by the CELF2 gene (previously CUGBP2).

Members of the CELF/BRUNOL protein family are RNA-binding proteins and contain two N-terminal RNA recognition motif (RRM) domains, one C-terminal RRM domain, and a divergent segment of 160-230 aa between the second and third RRM domains. Members of this protein family regulate pre-mRNA alternative splicing and may also be involved in mRNA editing, and translation. Alternative splicing results in multiple transcript variants encoding different isoforms.

== Interactions ==
CUGBP2 has been shown to interact with A1CF.
