= HNRNPA0 =

Protein-coding gene in the species Homo sapiens

Identifiers
- Aliases: HNRNPA0, HNRPA0, heterogeneous nuclear ribonucleoprotein A0
- External IDs: OMIM: 609409; MGI: 1924384; GeneCards: HNRNPA0

Gene location (Human)
Chr.	Chromosome 5 (human)
Band	5q31.2	Start	137,745,651 bp
Band	5q31.2	End	137,754,363 bp

Gene location (Mouse)
Chr.	Chromosome 13 (mouse)
Band	13|13 B1	Start	58,273,693 bp
Band	13|13 B1	End	58,276,370 bp
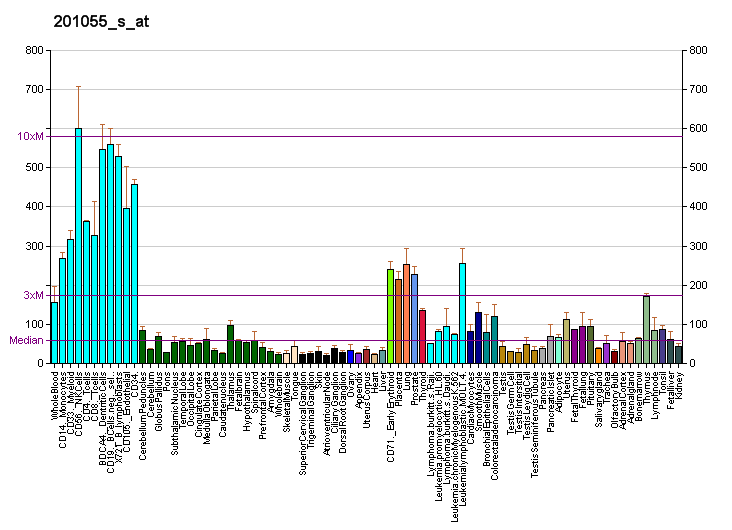

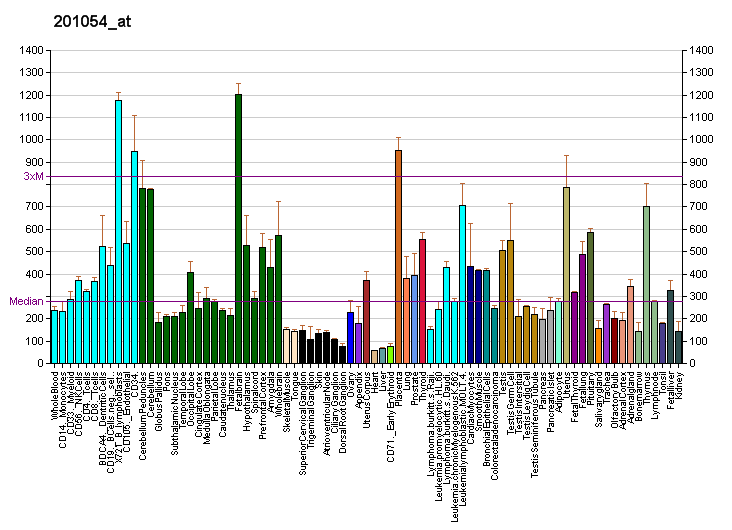
RNA expression pattern
Bgee	Human / Mouse (ortholog); Top expressed in: germinal epithelium; endothelial cell; middle temporal gyrus; embryo; tail of epididymis; retinal pigment epithelium; lactiferous duct; cartilage tissue; pons; caput epididymis / Top expressed in: hand; otolith organ; utricle; ganglionic eminence; abdominal wall; primitive streak; medial ganglionic eminence; ventricular zone; hair follicle; vas deferens; More reference expression data
BioGPS	More reference expression data
Gene ontology
Molecular function	protein kinase binding; nucleic acid binding; RNA binding; mRNA binding; mRNA 3'-UTR AU-rich region binding
Cellular component	nucleoplasm; nucleus; ribonucleoprotein complex
Biological process	mRNA splicing, via spliceosome; mRNA processing; 3'-UTR-mediated mRNA stabilization; inflammatory response; response to lipopolysaccharide; RNA metabolic process
Sources:Amigo / QuickGO
Orthologs
Databases	NCBI: entry; OMA: entry
Species	Human	Mouse
Entrez	10949	77134
Ensembl	ENSG00000177733	ENSMUSG00000007836
UniProt	Q13151	Q9CX86
RefSeq (mRNA)	NM_006805	NM_029872
RefSeq (protein)	NP_006796	NP_084148
Location (UCSC)	Chr 5: 137.75 – 137.75 Mb	Chr 13: 58.27 – 58.28 Mb
PubMed search
- Wikidata
View/Edit Human	View/Edit Mouse

Heterogeneous nuclear ribonucleoprotein A0 is a protein that in humans is encoded by the HNRNPA0 gene.

This gene belongs to the A/B subfamily of ubiquitously expressed heterogeneous nuclear ribonucleoproteins (hnRNPs). The hnRNPs are RNA binding proteins and they complex with heterogeneous nuclear RNA (hnRNA). These proteins are associated with pre-mRNAs in the nucleus and appear to influence pre-mRNA processing and other aspects of mRNA metabolism and transport. While all of the hnRNPs are present in the nucleus, some seem to shuttle between the nucleus and the cytoplasm. The hnRNP proteins have distinct nucleic acid binding properties. The protein encoded by this gene has two repeats of quasi-RRM domains that bind RNAs, followed by a glycine-rich C-terminus.
