= HNRNPK =

Human protein and coding gene

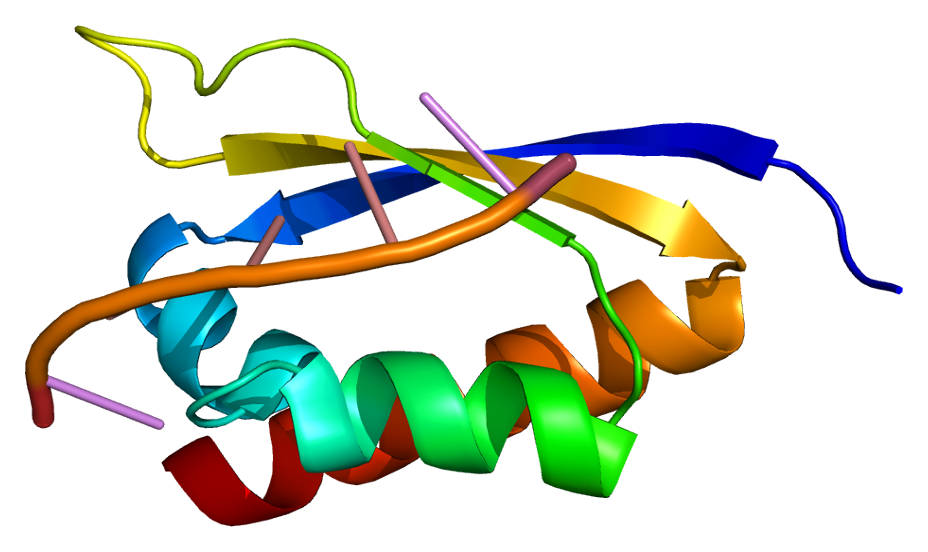
Available structures
PDB	Ortholog search: PDBe RCSB
PDB	List of PDB id codes 1J5K, 1KHM, 1ZZI, 1ZZJ, 1ZZK

Identifiers
- Aliases: HNRNPK, CSBP, HNRPK, TUNP, AUKS, heterogeneous nuclear ribonucleoprotein K
- External IDs: OMIM: 600712; MGI: 99894; HomoloGene: 81909; GeneCards: HNRNPK; OMA:HNRNPK - orthologs

Gene location (Human)
Chr.	Chromosome 9 (human)
Band	9q21.32	Start	83,968,083 bp
Band	9q21.32	End	83,980,616 bp

Gene location (Mouse)
Chr.	Chromosome 13 (mouse)
Band	13|13 B1	Start	58,391,142 bp
Band	13|13 B1	End	58,403,343 bp
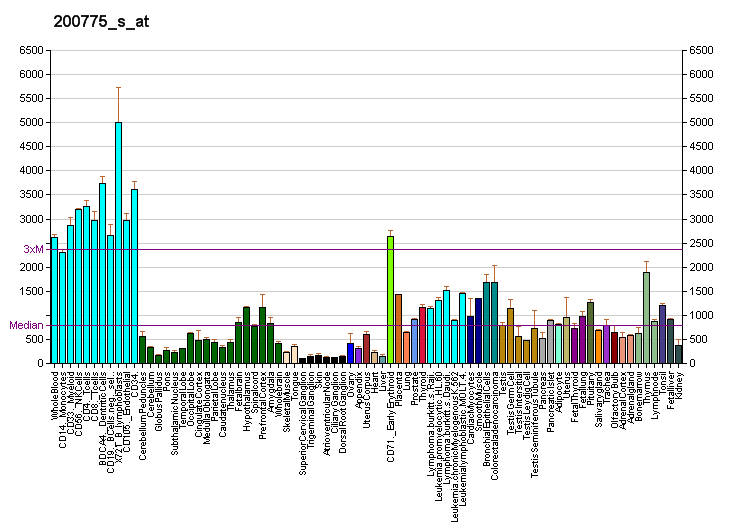
RNA expression pattern
Bgee	Human / Mouse (ortholog); Top expressed in: Achilles tendon; ventricular zone; ganglionic eminence; appendix; monocyte; right uterine tube; smooth muscle tissue; left ovary; right lobe of thyroid gland; left lobe of thyroid gland / Top expressed in: tail of embryo; genital tubercle; ventricular zone; neural tube; epiblast; ovary; mesencephalon; ganglionic eminence; spermatocyte; neural layer of retina; More reference expression data
BioGPS	More reference expression data
Gene ontology
Molecular function	DNA-binding transcription activator activity, RNA polymerase II-specific; RNA polymerase II cis-regulatory region sequence-specific DNA binding; protein binding; nucleic acid binding; DNA binding; single-stranded DNA binding; RNA binding; cadherin binding; protein domain specific binding; identical protein binding
Cellular component	cytoplasm; membrane; focal adhesion; nucleus; catalytic step 2 spliceosome; cell projection; extracellular exosome; podosome; spliceosomal complex; cell junction; extracellular matrix; nucleoplasm; cytoplasmic stress granule
Biological process	positive regulation of receptor-mediated endocytosis; regulation of transcription by RNA polymerase II; negative regulation of mRNA splicing, via spliceosome; regulation of intrinsic apoptotic signaling pathway in response to DNA damage by p53 class mediator; regulation of transcription, DNA-templated; transcription, DNA-templated; viral process; RNA processing; mRNA processing; regulation of low-density lipoprotein particle clearance; mRNA splicing, via spliceosome; signal transduction; positive regulation of transcription by RNA polymerase II; negative regulation of apoptotic process; RNA splicing; transcription by RNA polymerase II; RNA metabolic process
Sources:Amigo / QuickGO
Orthologs
Species	Human	Mouse
Entrez	3190	15387
Ensembl	ENSG00000165119	ENSMUSG00000021546
UniProt	P61978	P61979
RefSeq (mRNA)	NM_002140; NM_031262; NM_031263; NM_001318186; NM_001318187 NM_001318188	NM_001301340; NM_001301341; NM_001301343; NM_001301344; NM_001301345 NM_025279
RefSeq (protein)	NP_001305115; NP_001305116; NP_001305117; NP_002131; NP_112552 NP_112553	NP_001288269; NP_001288270; NP_001288272; NP_001288273; NP_001288274 NP_079555; NP_001347419; NP_001347420; NP_001347422; NP_001347423; NP_001347424
Location (UCSC)	Chr 9: 83.97 – 83.98 Mb	Chr 13: 58.39 – 58.4 Mb
PubMed search
- Wikidata
View/Edit Human	View/Edit Mouse

Heterogeneous nuclear ribonucleoprotein K (also protein K) is a protein that in humans is encoded by the HNRNPK gene. It is found in the cell nucleus that binds to pre-messenger RNA (mRNA) as a component of heterogeneous ribonucleoprotein particles. The simian homolog is known as protein H16. Both proteins bind to single-stranded DNA as well as to RNA and can stimulate the activity of RNA polymerase II, the protein responsible for most gene transcription. The relative affinities of the proteins for DNA and RNA vary with solution conditions and are inversely correlated, so that conditions promoting strong DNA binding result in weak RNA binding.

RNA binding protein domains in other proteins that are similar to the RNA binding domain of protein K are called K-homology or KH domains.

Protein K has been the subject of study related to colorectal cancer, in which an RNA editing event inducing the expression of an isoform containing a point mutation was found to be specific to cancerous cells.

== Function ==
This gene belongs to the subfamily of ubiquitously expressed heterogeneous nuclear ribonucleoproteins (hnRNPs). The hnRNPs are RNA-binding proteins, and they complex with heterogeneous nuclear RNA (hnRNA). These proteins are associated with pre-mRNAs in the nucleus and appear to influence pre-mRNA processing and other aspects of mRNA metabolism and transport. While all of the hnRNPs are present in the nucleus, some seem to shuttle between the nucleus and the cytoplasm.

The hnRNP proteins have distinct nucleic acid binding properties. The protein encoded by this gene is located in the nucleoplasm and has three repeats of KH domains that binds to RNAs. It is distinct among other hnRNP proteins in its binding preference; it binds tenaciously to poly(C). This protein is also thought to have a role during cell cycle progression. Multiple alternatively spliced transcript variants have been described for this gene, but only three variants have been fully described.

Mutations in both copies of HNRNPK are embryonic lethal in mice. Mice with both copies of the gene knocked out die before the 14th day of embryonic development.

== Clinical significance ==
=== Okamoto syndrome ===
Mutations in HNRNPK cause Okamoto syndrome, also known as Au–Kline syndrome.

=== Blood cancers ===
Deletions in the region encompassing HNRNPK have been found in the cells of acute myeloid leukemia in approximately 2% of cases. Additionally, a majority of mice who have had one of their HNRNPK genes artificially knocked out developed myeloid cancers, with a third developing lymphoid cancers and 4% developing hepatocellular carcinomas. The mice were also smaller, had less developed organs and had higher postnatal mortality (30%). The median lifespan of the mice that survived was less than 50% that of wild-type mice. Deficiencies in HNRNPK appear to specifically reduce the levels of the p42 isoform of CEBPA, which is a transcription factor involved in the differentiation of certain blood cells, as well as p21 (cyclin-dependent kinase inhibitor 1), which is involved in pausing cell development for DNA repair.

HNRNPK overexpression also appears to contribute to cancers via a different mechanism involving translation rather than transcription.

== Interactions ==
HNRPK has been shown to interact with:

- CSK,
- DDX1,
- HNRNPL,
- KHDRBS1,
- PCBP2,
- PRMT1, and
- PTBP1.

== Human proteins containing a KH domain ==
AKAP1; ANKHD1; ANKRD17; ASCC1; BICC1; DDX43; DDX53; DPPA5; FMR1; FUBP1; FUBP3; FXR1; FXR2; HDLBP; HNRPK; IGF2BP1; IGF2BP2; IGF2BP3; KHDRBS1; KHDRBS2; KHDRBS3; KHSRP; KRR1; MEX3A; MEX3B; MEX3C; MEX3D; NOVA1; NOVA2; PCBP1; PCBP2; PCBP3; PCBP4; PNO1; PNPT1; QKI; SF1; TDRKH;
