= TMEM39B =

Protein-coding gene in humans

Identifiers
- Aliases: TMEM39B, transmembrane protein 39B
- External IDs: MGI: 2682939; GeneCards: TMEM39B

Gene location (Human)
Chr.	Chromosome 1 (human)
Band	1p35.2	Start	32,072,031 bp
Band	1p35.2	End	32,102,866 bp

Gene location (Mouse)
Chr.	Chromosome 4 (mouse)
Band	4|4 D2.2	Start	129,570,148 bp
Band	4|4 D2.2	End	129,590,631 bp
RNA expression pattern
Bgee	Human / Mouse (ortholog); Top expressed in: gonad; monocyte; granulocyte; body of uterus; ganglionic eminence; stromal cell of endometrium; canal of the cervix; Descending thoracic aorta; ectocervix; ventricular zone / Top expressed in: primary oocyte; seminiferous tubule; hand; genital tubercle; secondary oocyte; tail of embryo; epiblast; ventricular zone; embryo; yolk sac; More reference expression data
BioGPS	n/a
Orthologs
Databases	NCBI: entry; OMA: entry
Species	Human	Mouse
Entrez	55116	230770
Ensembl	ENSG00000121775	ENSMUSG00000053730
UniProt	Q9GZU3	Q810L4
RefSeq (mRNA)	NM_018056; NM_001319677; NM_001319678; NM_001319679	NM_199305; NM_001356378
RefSeq (protein)	NP_001306606; NP_001306607; NP_001306608; NP_060526	NP_955009; NP_001343307
Location (UCSC)	Chr 1: 32.07 – 32.1 Mb	Chr 4: 129.57 – 129.59 Mb
PubMed search
- Wikidata
View/Edit Human	View/Edit Mouse

Transmembrane protein 39B (TMEM39B) is a protein that in humans is encoded by the gene TMEM39B. TMEM39B is a multi-pass membrane protein with eight transmembrane domains.

This protein localizes to the plasma membrane and vesicles. The precise function of TMEM39B is not yet well-understood by the scientific community, but differential expression is associated with survival of B cell lymphoma, and knockdown of TMEM39B is associated with decreased autophagy in cells infected with the Sindbis virus. Furthermore, the TMEM39B protein been found to interact with the SARS-CoV-2 ORF9C (also known as ORF14) protein. TMEM39B is expressed at moderate levels in most tissues, with higher expression in the testis, placenta, white blood cells, adrenal gland, thymus, and fetal brain.

== Gene ==
The TMEM39B gene in humans is located on the plus strand at 1p35.2. The gene is composed of 14 exons and covers 30.8 kb, spanning from 32,072,031 to 32,102,866. It is flanked by KHDRBS1 upstream and KPNA6 downstream. The TMEM39B gene region also contains the microRNA-encoding gene MIR5585.

== Transcript ==
There are four validated transcript variants for TMEM39B produced by different promoters and alternative splicing. Transcript variant 1 is translated into the longest and most abundant protein isoform.

Transcript Variants of TMEM39B
Transcript variant	RefSeq Accession	Length (bp)	Description	Number of exons
Transcript variant 1	NM_018056.4	1778 bp	Encodes isoform 1	9
Transcript variant 2	NM_001319677.1	2106 bp	Extended 5' UTR, encodes isoform 2	9
Transcript variant 3	NM_001319678.2	1542 bp	Lacks a portion of the 5' coding region, encodes isoform 3	7
Transcript variant 4	NM_001319679.2	1539 bp	Lacks a portion of the 5' coding region, encodes isoform 3	7

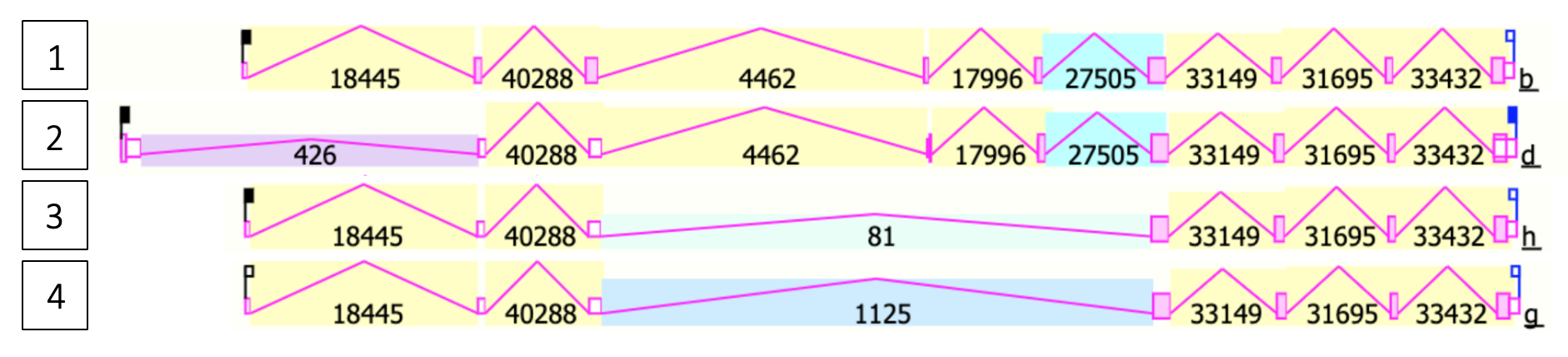
Validated transcript variants of TMEM39B, retrieved from AceView.

== Protein ==
=== Isoforms ===
There are three validated protein isoforms for TMEM39B. Isoform 1 is the longest and the other two isoforms use a downstream in-frame start codon.

Protein Isoforms of TMEM39B
Protein isoform	Protein size	Molecular weight	Description
Isoform 1	492 aa	56 kDa	Longest and most abundant isoform
Isoform 2	365 aa	42 kDa	Shorter at N-terminus, uses downstream in-frame start codon
Isoform 3	293 aa	33 kDa	Shorter at N-terminus, uses downstream in-frame start codon

=== General properties ===
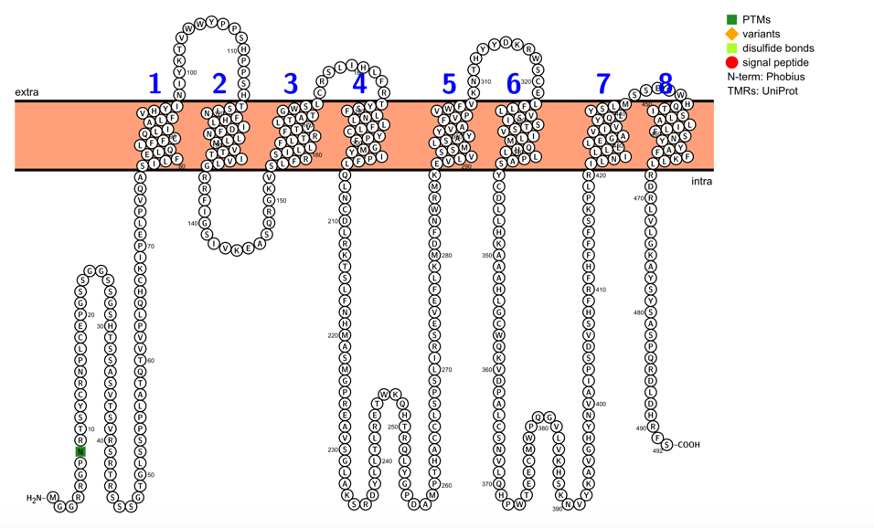
Diagram of TMEM39B topology predicted by Protter.

The human TMEM39B protein isoform 1 is composed of 492 amino acids and has a predicted molecular weight of 56 kDa. The basal isoelectric point (pI) of the protein is 9.51. Compared to the composition of the human proteome, TMEM39B has a higher percentage of serine, histidine, and leucine and a lower percentage of glutamate and aspartate, making it basic overall. It contains two pairs of tandem repeats: “GSSG” from amino acids 21–28 and “PPSH” from amino acids 107–114. There is a periodic motif of four leucines spaced seven residues apart from amino acids 168–195, which is not predicted to form a leucine zipper. There is an “F..Y” motif with three repeats from amino acids 183-202 and a motif of phenylalanine at every other residue from amino acids 409–416. There are no notable charge clusters, charge runs, or spacings, nor are there any sorting signals.

=== Topology ===
TMEM39B isoform 1 contains eight transmembrane regions, and the N-terminus and C-terminus are predicted to be located in the cytosol.

== Regulation ==
=== Gene-level regulation ===
==== Promoter ====
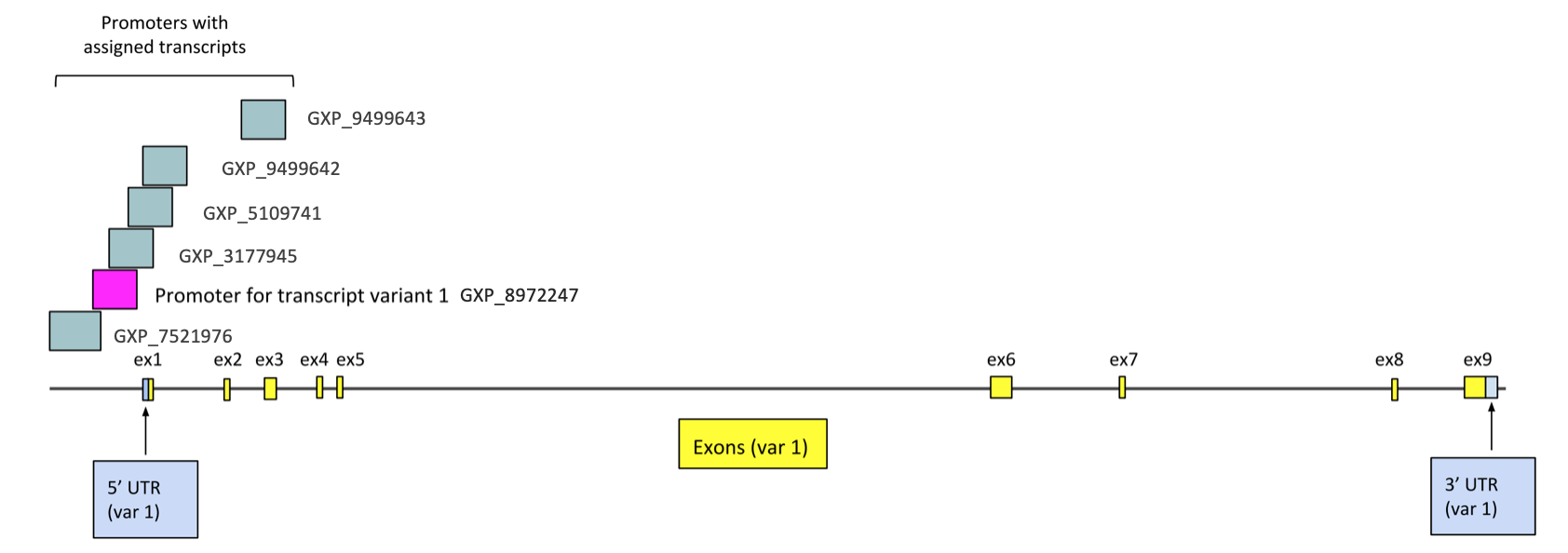
Promoters for TMEM39B.

TMEM39B has several promoter regions predicted by GenoMatix ElDorado. Most promoters are overlapping in a similar region, where use of a different promoter would only cause skipping of the first exon.

==== Transcription factors ====
The promoter of TMEM39B transcript variant 1 contains numerous transcription factor binding sites. The transcription factors SMARCA3, TLX1, and CMYB have binding sites with high affinity near the binding site of transcription factor IIB, so they are potential regulators of gene transcription.

TMEM39B Transcription Factors.
Transcription factor	Description	Matrix similarity
TCF11	TCF11/LCR-F1/Nrf1 homodimers	1
TFIIB	Transcription factor II B (TFIIB) recognition element	1
ETV1	Ets variant 1	0.996
ZNF300	KRAB-containing zinc finger protein 300	0.994
CMYB	c-Myb, important in hematopoesis, cellular equivalent to avian myoblastosis virus oncogene v-myb	0.994
ASCL1	Achaete-scute family bHLH transcription factor 1	0.99
OSR2	Odd-skipped related 2	0.99
E2F1	E2F transcription factor 1	0.989
ZNF35	Human zinc finger protein ZNF35	0.986
GKLF	Gut-enriched Krueppel-like factor	0.981
PURALPHA	Purine-rich element binding protein A	0.974
SMARCA3	SWI/SNF related, matrix associated, actin dependent regulator of chromatin, subfamily a, member 3	0.973
NFAT	Nuclear factor of activated T-cells	0.971
ZF5	Zinc finger / POZ domain transcription factor	0.962
INSM1	Zinc finger protein insulinoma-associated 1 (IA-1)	0.958
ZBTB14	Zinc finger and BTB domain containing 14 (ZFP-5, ZFP161)	0.914
KLF6	Core promoter-binding protein (CPBP) with 3 Krueppel-type zinc fingers (KLF6, ZF9)	0.891
GABPA	GA binding protein transcription factor, alpha	0.891
TLX1	T-cell leukemia homeobox 1	0.873
ZNF704	Zinc finger protein 704	0.847

==== Expression pattern ====
RNA sequencing data show that TMEM39B is expressed in all tissues types, with higher levels in the testis, placenta, white blood cells, adrenal gland, thymus, and fetal brain. Microarray data show that TMEM39B is expressed at moderate levels in most tissues, on average in the 58th percentile of genes expressed in a given tissue sample. By percentile rank, TMEM39B is most highly expressed with respect to other genes in BDCA4+ dendritic cells, CD19+ B-cells, and CD14+ monocytes.

=== Transcript-level regulation ===
==== miRNA binding sites ====
The 3' UTR of the TMEM39B protein contains binding sites for the miRNAs miR-1290, miR-4450, and miRNA-520d-5p. Binding of these miRNAs may lead to RNA silencing.

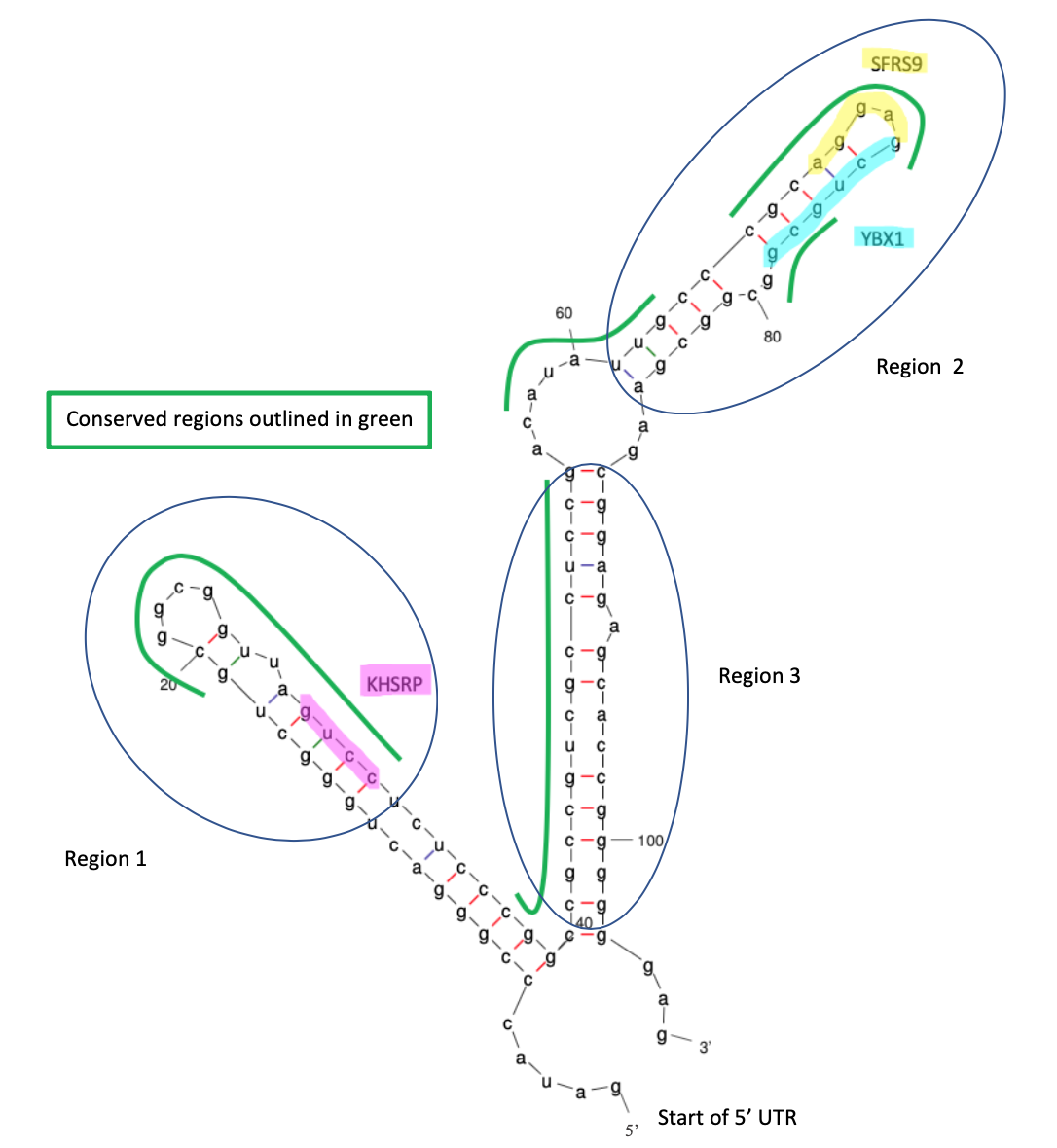
5' UTR of TMEM39B transcript variant 1. Structure generated by Mfold.

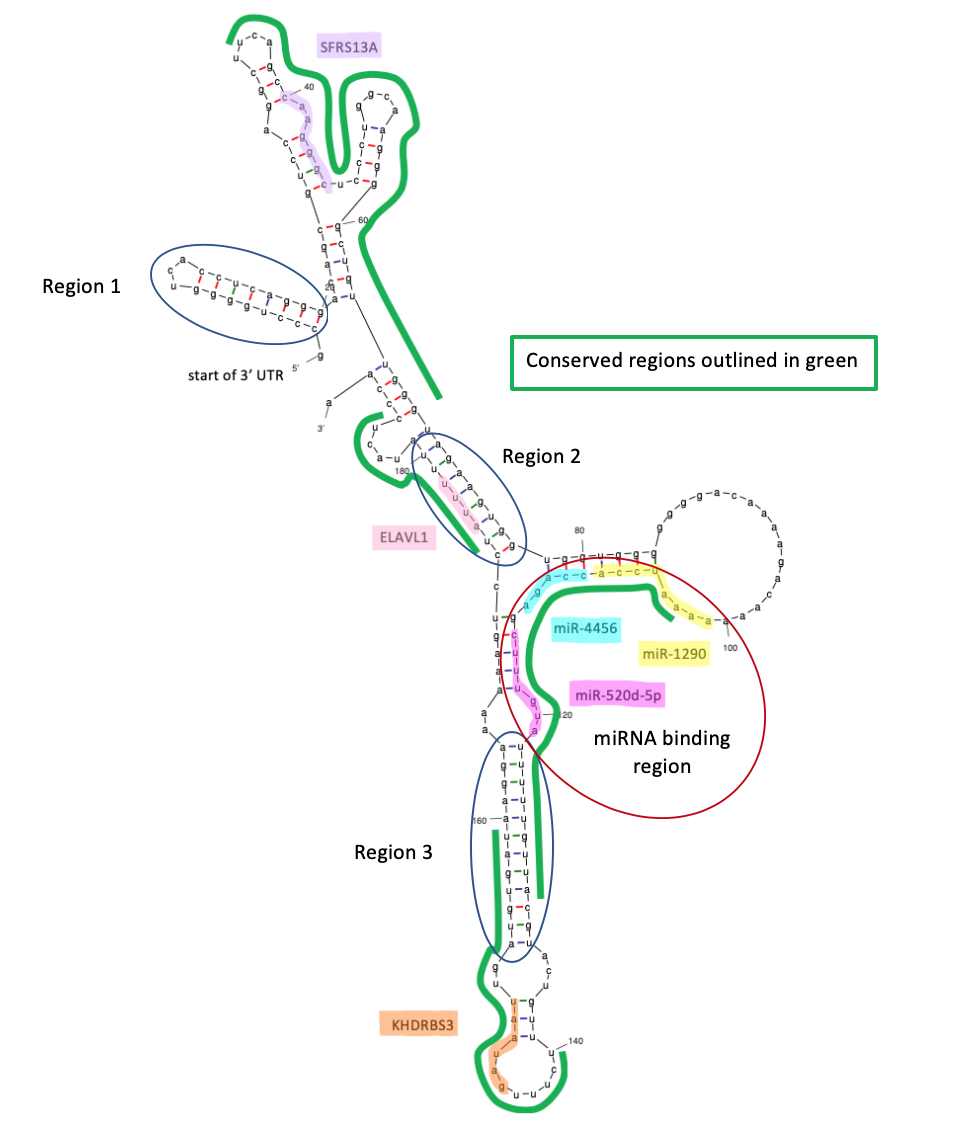
3' UTR of TMEM39B transcript variant 1. Structure generated by Mfold.

==== mRNA-binding proteins ====
The RNA-binding proteins SRSF10, ELAVL1, and KHDRBS3 have binding sites in the 3' UTR, and the proteins KHSRP, SFRS9 and YBX1 have binding sites in the 5' UTR.

==== Secondary structure ====
The predicted secondary structure of the 5' and 3' UTR of TMEM39B contains multiple stem-loops which may play a role in stability and binding.

=== Protein-level regulation ===
==== Post-translational modifications ====
Conceptual translation of TMEM39B transcript variant 1.

The TMEM39B protein contains numerous sites of predicted post-translational modifications, including phosphorylation, SUMOylation, acetylation, and glycosylation. Sites of predicted S-palmitoylation at Cys13, Cys87, and Cys264 are conserved in orthologs. SUMOylation is predicted at Lys279 and Lys359. Several well-conserved sites of phosphorylation, glycation, and O-linked-N-acetylglucosaminylation are predicted in cytosolic regions of the protein, as annotated on the conceptual translation of TMEM39B transcript variant 1.

==== Sub-cellular localization ====
The TMEM39B protein has been found to localize to the vesicles using immunohistochemistry.

== Homology and Evolution ==
=== Paralogs ===
The human TMEM39B gene has a paralog called TMEM39A, also referred to by the alias SUSR2 (suppressor of SQST-1 aggregates in rpl-43 mutants), which is located at 3q13.33. The TMEM39A protein contains 488 amino acids and shares 51.2% identity with TMEM39B. Although the function of the paralog TMEM39A is not well-understood, variants are associated with greater risk of autoimmune disease. The paralog TMEM39A has also been found to interact with Encephalomyocarditis virus (EMCV) capsid proteins as a regulator of the viral autophagy pathway.

=== Orthologs ===
TMEM39B has orthologs in species as distant as cartilaginous fish. Mammalian orthologs are highly similar to human TMEM39B, with percent identity greater than 85%. In orthologs in birds, reptiles, and amphibians, the percent identity to human TMEM39B ranges between 70% and 85%. In fish, the percent identity ranges from 40% to 75%. TMEM39B is only conserved in vertebrates, but the paralog TMEM39A has orthologs in species as distant as arthropods. A selected list of orthologs from NCBI BLAST is displayed below.

TMEM39B Orthologs
Genus and Species	Common name	Taxonomic group	Date of divergence (MYA) from humans	Accession #	Sequence length (aa)	Sequence identity to human protein	Sequence similarity to human protein
Homo sapiens	Human	Mammalia	0	NP_060526.2	492	100	100
Mus musculus	House mouse	Mammalia	89	NP_955009.1	492	96.1	98
Ornithorhynchus anatinus	Platypus	Mammalia	180	XP_028937398.1	489	85.8	90.5
Gallus gallus	Red junglefowl	Aves	318	NP_001006313.2	489	85	91.5
Thamnophis elegans	Western terrestrial garter snake	Reptilia	318	XP_032083369.1	491	81.5	88.5
Xenopus tropicalis	Western clawed frog	Amphibia	352	NP_001005048.1	483	75.2	83.2
Oryzias latipes	Japanese medaka	Actinopterygii	433	XP_004082414.1	488	74.3	85.2
Danio rerio	Zebrafish	Actinopterygii	433	NP_956154.1	491	74.2	84.9
Erpetoichthys calabaricus	Reedfish	Actinopterygii	433	XP_028675900.1	489	71.8	84.6
Callorhinchus milii	Australian ghostshark	Chondrichthyes	465	XP_007902480.1	490	73	85.1
Amblyraja radiata	Thorny skate	Chondrichthyes	465	XP_032900681.1	504	70.5	83.5
Scyliorhinus torazame	Cloudy catshark	Chondrichthyes	465	GCB75241.1	373	55.5	65.4

=== Evolution ===
The TMEM39B gene appears most distantly in cartilaginous fish (chondrichthyes), which diverged from humans approximately 465 million years ago. Orthologs of the paralog TMEM39A are found in arthropods, which diverged from humans approximately 763 million years ago, suggesting that TMEM39B was produced by the duplication of an ancestral form of TMEM39A .

TMEM39B evolves at a relatively slow rate; a 1% change in the amino acid sequence requires approximately 13.9 million years. Based on sequence similarity of orthologs, TMEM39B evolves approximately 1.5 times faster than cytochrome c and 7 times slower than fibrinogen alpha.

== Interacting proteins ==
=== Immune proteins ===
Using co-immunoprecipitation, affinity capture MS, and two-hybrid screens, the TMEM39B protein has been found to interact with various membrane glycoproteins . Many interacting proteins have immune functions, including IL13RA1 (interleukin-13 receptor subunit alpha-1), KLRD1 (killer cell lectin-like receptor subfamily D, member 1), and SEMA7A (semaphorin-7A). SEMA7A acts as an activator of T cells and monocytes, while KLDR1 encodes an antigen presented on natural killer cells. IL13RA1 has been proposed to mediate JAK-STAT signaling, which regulates immune cell activation.

=== SARS-CoV-2 ===
The TMEM39B protein interacts with the SARS-CoV-2 ORF9c accessory protein, also sometimes referred to as ORF14. ORF9C is located within the nucleocapsid (N) gene, overlapping with ORF9b. Two mutations in OFC9c resulting in premature stop codons have been observed in SARS-CoV-2 isolates, suggesting that this reading frame is dispensable for viral replication. The ORF9c protein has been shown to localize to vesicles when transfected into HeLa cells and is predicted to have a non-cytoplasmic domain and transmembrane domain.

== Variants ==
Many SNPs (single nucleotide polymorphisms) have been detected in the TMEM39B gene, of which a smaller subset cause nonsynonymous amino acid changes. There are notably fewer SNPs that occur at sites of post-translational modifications, motifs, or highly conserved amino acids; changes in these amino acids may be more likely to have phenotypic effects. The table below lists selected SNPs resulting in a change at such sites.

Selected SNPs in TMEM39B
SNP	mRNA position	Base change	Amino acid position	Amino acid change	Description
rs1259613993	180	C > T	11	S > P	“GSSG” repeat
rs1446462546	271	C > T	41	S > F	O-GlcNAc, phosphorylation site
rs867417059	282	A > T	45	S > C	O-GlcNAc, phosphorylation site
rs1009960963	289	C > T	47	S > F	Phosphorylation site
rs377359320	503	C > A	118	N > K	Highly conserved
rs748779192	555	C > T	136	R > C	Highly conserved
rs778604874	558	C > T	137	R > C	Highly conserved
rs1419668726	696	T > C	183	F > L	[F..Y] motif
rs759591458	963	C > T	272	R > C	Highly conserved
rs1180695332	1003	G > C	285	R > P	Highly conserved
rs200048180	1009	A > G	287	K > R	Glycation site
rs1445226108	1060	C > T	304	P > L	Highly conserved
rs771743935	1206	C > A	353	H > N	Highly conserved
rs376257849	1294	G > A	382	G > D	Highly conserved
rs1368770455	1302	G > T	385	V > L	Highly conserved
rs756106866	1336	G > A	396	G > D	Highly conserved
rs868721112	1356	C > T	403	P > S	Highly conserved
rs1383803294	1369	C > G	407	S > C	Phosphorylation site
rs917085732	1581	T > G	478	S > A	O-GlcNAc, phosphorylation site

== Clinical significance ==
In a study using 164 tumor samples from patients with diffuse large B cell lymphoma, TMEM39B was one of 17 genes identified as part of a prognostic profile for 5-year progression-free survival. In another study using a genome-wide siRNA screen, knockdown of TMEM39B with siRNAs decreased viral capsid/autophagosome colocalization, survival of virus-infected cells, and mitophagy in HeLa cells infected with Sindbis virus. This may suggest that TMEM39B plays a role in viral autophagy like its paralog TMEM39A.
