= QKI =

Protein

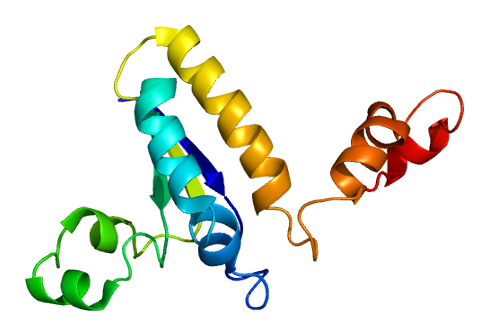
Available structures
PDB	Ortholog search: PDBe RCSB
PDB	List of PDB id codes 4JVH

Identifiers
- Aliases: QKI, Hqk, QK, QK1, QK3, hqkI, KH domain containing, RNA binding, KH domain containing RNA binding
- External IDs: OMIM: 609590; MGI: 97837; HomoloGene: 11059; GeneCards: QKI; OMA:QKI - orthologs

Gene location (Human)
Chr.	Chromosome 6 (human)
Band	6q26	Start	163,414,000 bp
Band	6q26	End	163,578,592 bp

Gene location (Mouse)
Chr.	Chromosome 17 (mouse)
Band	17 A1|17 7.75 cM	Start	10,421,530 bp
Band	17 A1|17 7.75 cM	End	10,538,783 bp
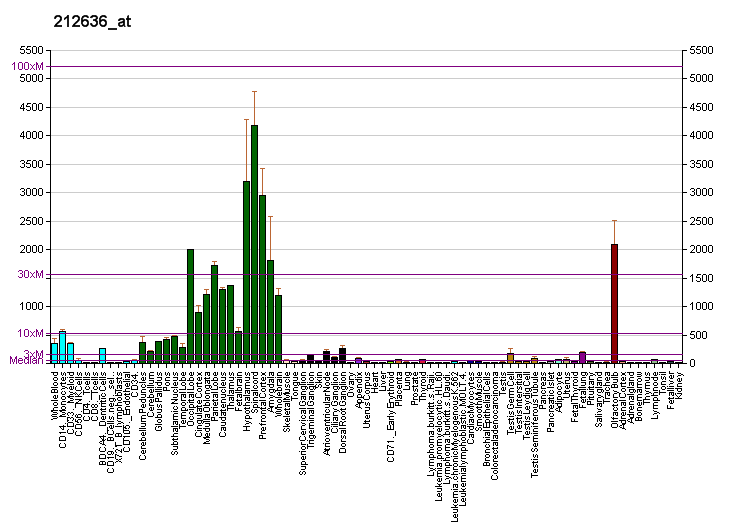

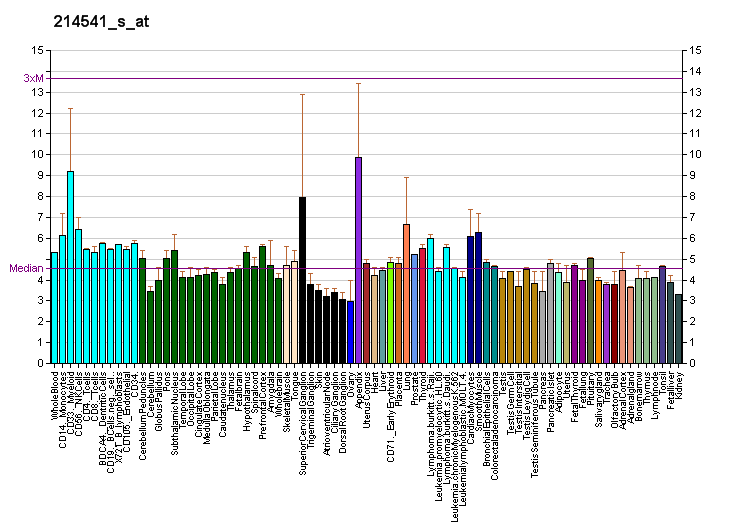

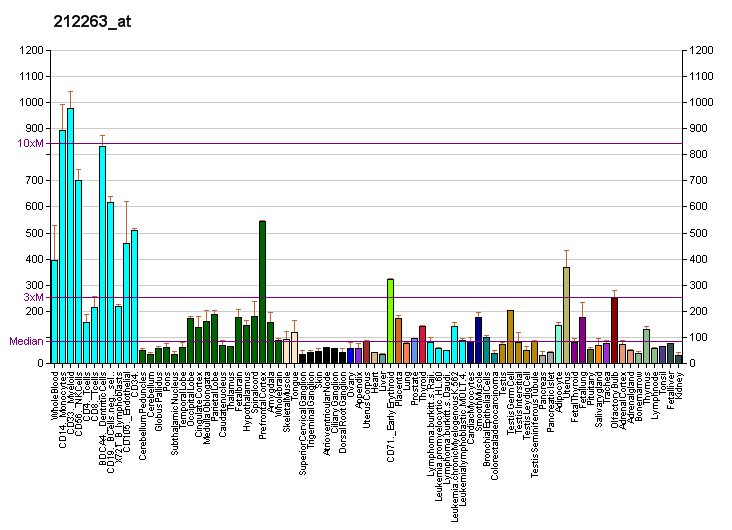
RNA expression pattern
Bgee	Human / Mouse (ortholog); Top expressed in: endothelial cell; dorsal motor nucleus of vagus nerve; corpus callosum; inferior olivary nucleus; inferior ganglion of vagus nerve; external globus pallidus; pars reticulata; subthalamic nucleus; superior vestibular nucleus; internal globus pallidus / Top expressed in: Gonadal ridge; otic placode; saccule; sciatic nerve; left lung lobe; deep cerebellar nuclei; substantia nigra; cumulus cell; lateral geniculate nucleus; tail of embryo; More reference expression data
BioGPS	More reference expression data
Gene ontology
Molecular function	SH3 domain binding; protein binding; nucleic acid binding; mRNA binding; RNA binding
Cellular component	cytoplasm; nucleus; synapse
Biological process	cell differentiation; mRNA transport; mRNA processing; vasculogenesis; multicellular organism development; axon ensheathment; muscle cell differentiation; positive regulation of gene expression; long-chain fatty acid biosynthetic process; RNA splicing; spermatid development; myelination; 3'-UTR-mediated mRNA destabilization; regulation of translation; transport
Sources:Amigo / QuickGO
Orthologs
Species	Human	Mouse
Entrez	9444	19317
Ensembl	ENSG00000112531	ENSMUSG00000062078
UniProt	Q96PU8	Q9QYS9
RefSeq (mRNA)	NM_001301085; NM_006775; NM_206853; NM_206854; NM_206855	NM_001159516; NM_001159517; NM_021881
RefSeq (protein)	NP_001288014; NP_006766; NP_996735; NP_996736; NP_996737	NP_001152988; NP_001152989; NP_068681
Location (UCSC)	Chr 6: 163.41 – 163.58 Mb	Chr 17: 10.42 – 10.54 Mb
PubMed search
- Wikidata
View/Edit Human	View/Edit Mouse

Quaking homolog, KH domain RNA binding (mouse), also known as QKI, is a protein which in humans is encoded by the QKI gene.

QKI belongs to a family of RNA-binding proteins called STAR proteins for Signal Transduction and Activation of RNA. They have an HNRNPK homology (KH) domain embedded in a 200-amino acid region called the GSG domain. Other members of this family include SAM68 (KHDRBS1) and SF1. Two more new members are KHDRBS3 and KHDRBS2.

The QKI gene is implicated as being important in schizophrenia, and QKI controls translation of many oligodendrocyte-related genes.
