= PCBP1 =

Protein-coding gene in the species Homo sapiens

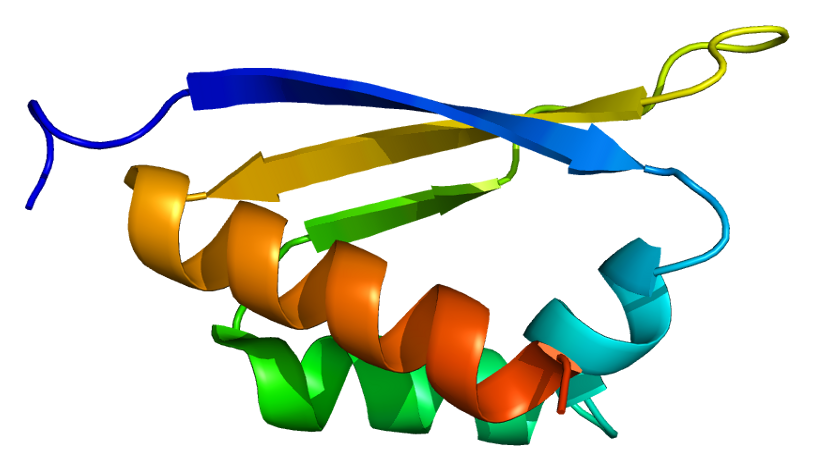

Identifiers
- Aliases: PCBP1, HEL-S-85, HNRPE1, HNRPX, hnRNP-E1, hnRNP-X, poly(rC) binding protein 1
- External IDs: OMIM: 601209; MGI: 1345635; GeneCards: PCBP1
Available structures
PDB	Ortholog search: PDBe RCSB
PDB	List of PDB id codes 1WVN, 1ZTG, 3VKE

Gene location (Human)
Chr.	Chromosome 2 (human)
Band	2p13.3	Start	70,087,477 bp
Band	2p13.3	End	70,089,203 bp

Gene location (Mouse)
Chr.	Chromosome 6 (mouse)
Band	6|6 D1	Start	86,501,474 bp
Band	6|6 D1	End	86,503,303 bp
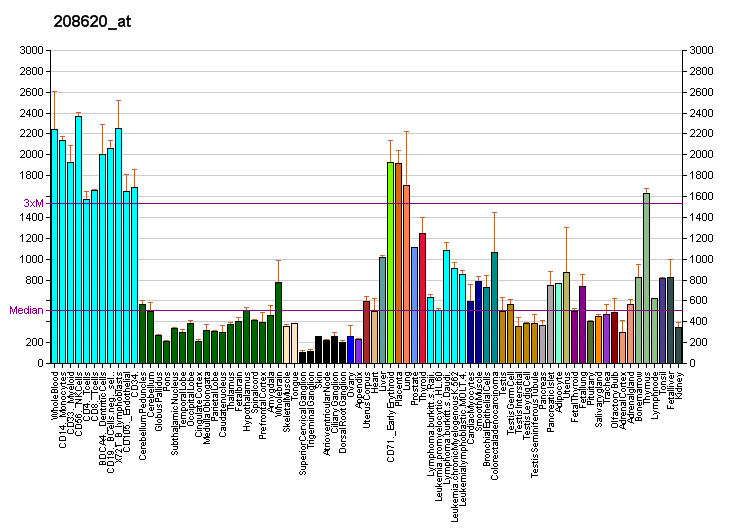
RNA expression pattern
Bgee	Human / Mouse (ortholog); Top expressed in: oocyte; gastrocnemius muscle; muscle of thigh; granulocyte; right adrenal gland; popliteal artery; tibial arteries; monocyte; right adrenal cortex; left adrenal gland / Top expressed in: primitive streak; abdominal wall; hair follicle; migratory enteric neural crest cell; medullary collecting duct; renal corpuscle; endothelial cell of lymphatic vessel; mandibular prominence; dermis; vestibular membrane of cochlear duct; More reference expression data
BioGPS	More reference expression data
Gene ontology
Molecular function	DNA binding; protein binding; mRNA binding; RNA binding; nucleic acid binding; single-stranded DNA binding; sequence-specific single stranded DNA binding; DNA-binding transcription factor activity, RNA polymerase II-specific; cadherin binding
Cellular component	cytoplasm; extracellular exosome; membrane; nucleus; nucleoplasm; cytosol; nuclear speck; cytoplasmic ribonucleoprotein granule
Biological process	mRNA splicing, via spliceosome; viral RNA genome replication; positive regulation of transcription by RNA polymerase II; RNA metabolic process
Sources:Amigo / QuickGO
Orthologs
Databases	NCBI: entry; OMA: entry
Species	Human	Mouse
Entrez	5093	23983
Ensembl	ENSG00000169564	ENSMUSG00000051695
UniProt	Q15365	P60335
RefSeq (mRNA)	NM_006196	NM_011865
RefSeq (protein)	NP_006187	NP_035995
Location (UCSC)	Chr 2: 70.09 – 70.09 Mb	Chr 6: 86.5 – 86.5 Mb
PubMed search
- Wikidata
View/Edit Human	View/Edit Mouse

Poly(rC)-binding protein 1 is a protein that in humans is encoded by the PCBP1 gene.

This intronless gene is thought to have been generated by retrotransposition of a fully processed PCBP-2 mRNA. This gene and PCBP-2 have paralogues (PCBP3 and PCBP4) which are thought to have arisen as a result of duplication events of entire genes. The protein encoded by this gene appears to be multifunctional. It along with PCBP2 and HNRNPK corresponds to the major cellular poly(rC)-binding protein. It contains three K-homologous (KH) domains which may be involved in RNA binding. This encoded protein together with PCBP-2 also functions as translational coactivators of poliovirus RNA via a sequence-specific interaction with stem-loop IV of the IRES and promote poliovirus RNA replication by binding to its 5'-terminal cloverleaf structure.

It has also been implicated in translational control of the 15-lipoxygenase mRNA, human Papillomavirus type 16 L2 mRNA, and hepatitis A virus RNA. The encoded protein is also suggested to play a part in formation of a sequence-specific alpha-globin mRNP complex which is associated with alpha-globin mRNA stability.
