= ANKHD1 =

Protein-coding gene in the species Homo sapiens

Identifiers
- Aliases: ANKHD1, MASK, VBARP, MASK1, PP2500, ankyrin repeat and KH domain containing 1
- External IDs: OMIM: 610500; MGI: 1921733; GeneCards: ANKHD1

Gene location (Human)
| Chr. | Chromosome 5 (human) |
| Band | 5q31.3 | Start | 140,401,814 bp |
| Band | 5q31.3 | End | 140,539,856 bp |

Gene location (Mouse)
| Chr. | Chromosome 18 (mouse) |
| Band | 18|18 B2 | Start | 36,693,040 bp |
| Band | 18|18 B2 | End | 36,791,966 bp |
RNA expression pattern
| Bgee | Human / Mouse (ortholog); Top expressed in: sural nerve; bone marrow cell; body of pancreas; epithelium of colon; ventricular zone; gastric mucosa; skin of abdomen; right lobe of thyroid gland; left ovary; right ovary / Top expressed in: genital tubercle; tail of embryo; Rostral migratory stream; lacrimal gland; neural layer of retina; crypt of lieberkuhn of small intestine; conjunctival fornix; hair follicle; ciliary body; retinal pigment epithelium; More reference expression data |
| BioGPS | n/a |
Gene ontology
| Molecular function | protein binding; nucleic acid binding; RNA binding |
| Cellular component | cytoplasm |
| Biological process | innate immune response |
Sources:Amigo / QuickGO
Orthologs
| Databases | NCBI: entry; OMA: entry |
| Species | Human | Mouse |
| Entrez | 54882 | 108857 |
| Ensembl | ENSG00000131503 | ENSMUSG00000024483 |
| UniProt | Q8IWZ3 | n/a |
| RefSeq (mRNA) | NM_024668; NM_001197030; NM_017747; NM_017978 | NM_175375 |
| RefSeq (protein) | NP_065741; NP_001183959; NP_060217; NP_060448; NP_078944 | n/a |
| Location (UCSC) | Chr 5: 140.4 – 140.54 Mb | Chr 18: 36.69 – 36.79 Mb |
| PubMed search |
- Wikidata
| View/Edit Human | View/Edit Mouse |

Ankyrin repeat and KH domain-containing protein 1 is a protein that in humans is encoded by the ANKHD1 gene.

== Function ==
This gene encodes a protein with multiple ankyrin repeat domains and a single KH domain. Co-transcription of this gene and the neighboring downstream gene (EIF4EBP3) generates a transcript (MASK-BP3) which encodes a fusion protein composed of the MASK protein sequence for the majority of the protein and a different C-terminus due to an alternate reading frame for the EIF4EBP3 segments.
