= PCBP3 =

Gene of the species Homo sapiens

Identifiers
- Aliases: PCBP3, ALPHA-CP3, poly(rC) binding protein 3
- External IDs: OMIM: 608502; MGI: 1890470; GeneCards: PCBP3

Gene location (Mouse)
| Chr. | Chromosome 10 (mouse) |
| Band | 10|10 C1 | Start | 76,597,691 bp |
| Band | 10|10 C1 | End | 76,797,721 bp |
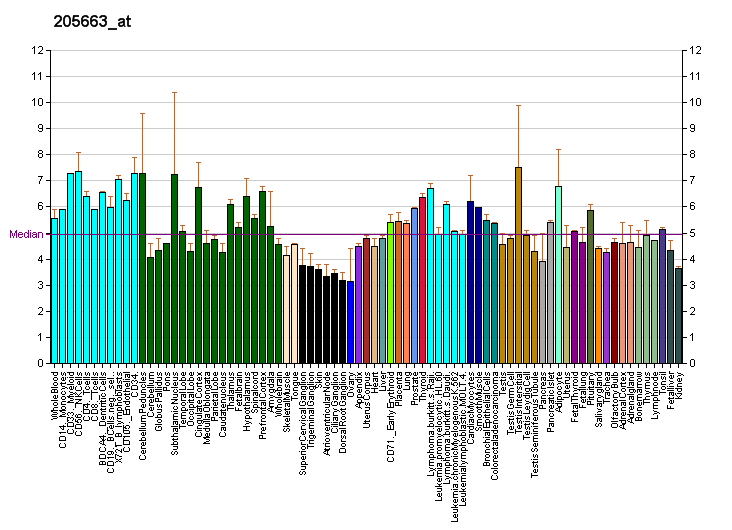
RNA expression pattern
| Bgee | Human / Mouse (ortholog); n/a / Top expressed in: neural layer of retina; trigeminal ganglion; seminiferous tubule; external carotid artery; spermatocyte; olfactory bulb; retinal pigment epithelium; spermatid; Rostral migratory stream; lumbar spinal ganglion |
| BioGPS | More reference expression data |
Gene ontology
| Molecular function | DNA binding; nucleic acid binding; DNA-binding transcription repressor activity, RNA polymerase II-specific; double-stranded DNA binding; C-rich single-stranded DNA binding; RNA binding |
| Cellular component | cytoplasm; cytosol; extracellular exosome; nucleus |
| Biological process | mRNA metabolic process; negative regulation of transcription by RNA polymerase II |
Sources:Amigo / QuickGO
Orthologs
| Databases | NCBI: entry; OMA: entry |
| Species | Human | Mouse |
| Entrez | 54039 | 59093 |
| Ensembl | ENSG00000183570 | ENSMUSG00000001120 |
| UniProt | P57721 | P57722 |
| RefSeq (mRNA) | NM_020528; NM_001130141 | NM_021568; NM_001347216 |
| RefSeq (protein) | NP_001123613; NP_065389; NP_001335167; NP_001335168; NP_001335169 NP_001335170; NP_001335171; NP_001335172; NP_001335173; NP_001335174; NP_001369205; NP_001369206; NP_001369207; NP_001369208; NP_001369210; NP_001369211; NP_001369212; NP_001369213; NP_001369214; NP_001369215; NP_001369216; NP_001369217; NP_001371085 | NP_001334145; NP_067543 |
| Location (UCSC) | n/a | Chr 10: 76.6 – 76.8 Mb |
| PubMed search |
- Wikidata
| View/Edit Human | View/Edit Mouse |

Poly(rC)-binding protein 3 is a protein that in humans is encoded by the PCBP3 gene.

This gene encodes a member of the KH domain protein subfamily. Proteins of this subfamily, also referred to as alpha-CPs, bind to RNA with a specificity for C-rich pyrimidine regions. Alpha-CPs play important roles in post-transcriptional activities and have different cellular distributions. This gene's protein is found in the cytoplasm, yet it lacks the nuclear localization signals found in other subfamily members. Multiple polyadenylation sites exist for this gene.
