= PCBP4 =

Protein-coding gene in the species Homo sapiens

Identifiers
- Aliases: PCBP4, CBP, LIP4, MCG10, poly(rC) binding protein 4
- External IDs: OMIM: 608503; MGI: 1890471; GeneCards: PCBP4

Gene location (Human)
| Chr. | Chromosome 3 (human) |
| Band | 3p21.2 | Start | 51,957,454 bp |
| Band | 3p21.2 | End | 51,974,016 bp |

Gene location (Mouse)
| Chr. | Chromosome 9 (mouse) |
| Band | 9|9 F1 | Start | 106,453,291 bp |
| Band | 9|9 F1 | End | 106,464,012 bp |
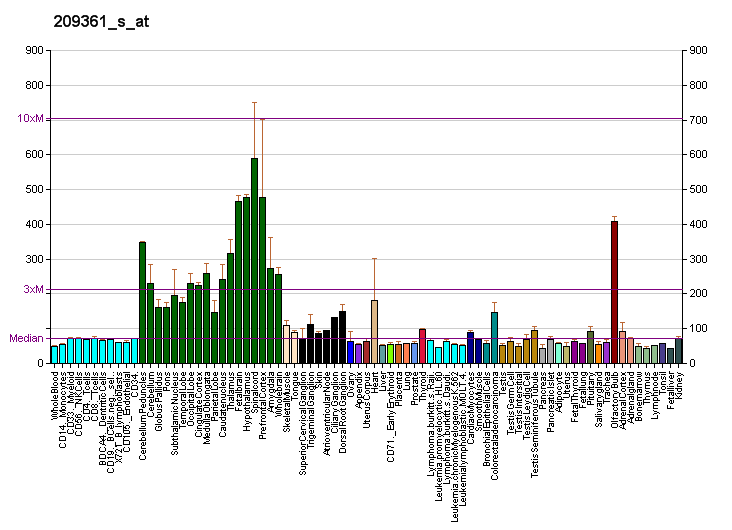
RNA expression pattern
| Bgee | Human / Mouse (ortholog); Top expressed in: right hemisphere of cerebellum; C1 segment; tibial nerve; sural nerve; right frontal lobe; muscle of thigh; gastrocnemius muscle; ganglionic eminence; apex of heart; amygdala / Top expressed in: neural layer of retina; cerebellar cortex; lobe of cerebellum; ventricular zone; cerebellar vermis; retinal pigment epithelium; medial ganglionic eminence; epiblast; somite; abdominal wall; More reference expression data |
| BioGPS | More reference expression data |
Gene ontology
| Molecular function | DNA binding; nucleic acid binding; mRNA 3'-UTR binding; RNA binding |
| Cellular component | cytoplasm; cytosol |
| Biological process | DNA damage response, signal transduction by p53 class mediator resulting in cell cycle arrest; regulation of mRNA stability |
Sources:Amigo / QuickGO
Orthologs
| Databases | NCBI: entry; OMA: entry |
| Species | Human | Mouse |
| Entrez | 57060 | 59092 |
| Ensembl | ENSG00000090097 | ENSMUSG00000023495 |
| UniProt | P57723 | P57724 |
| RefSeq (mRNA) | NM_001174100; NM_020418; NM_033008; NM_033009; NM_033010 | NM_021567 |
| RefSeq (protein) | NP_001167571; NP_065151; NP_127501; NP_127503; NP_001350814 | NP_067542 |
| Location (UCSC) | Chr 3: 51.96 – 51.97 Mb | Chr 9: 106.45 – 106.46 Mb |
| PubMed search |
- Wikidata
| View/Edit Human | View/Edit Mouse |

Poly(rC)-binding protein 4 is a protein that in humans is encoded by the PCBP4 gene.

This gene encodes a member of the KH domain protein subfamily. Proteins of this subfamily, also referred to as alpha-CPs, bind to RNA with a specificity for C-rich pyrimidine regions. Alpha-CPs play important roles in post-transcriptional activities and have different cellular distributions. This gene is induced by the p53 tumor suppressor, and the encoded protein can suppress cell proliferation by inducing apoptosis and cell cycle arrest in G(2)-M. This gene's protein is found in the cytoplasm, yet it lacks the nuclear localization signals found in other subfamily members. Multiple alternatively spliced transcript variants have been described, but the full-length nature for only some has been determined.
