= MEX3D =

Protein-coding gene in the species Homo sapiens

Identifiers
- Aliases: MEX3D, MEX-3D, MEX3, OK/SW-cl.4, RKHD1, RNF193, TINO, mex-3 RNA binding family member D
- External IDs: OMIM: 611009; MGI: 2681847; GeneCards: MEX3D
Available structures
PDB	Ortholog search: PDBe RCSB
PDB	List of PDB id codes 2DGR

Gene location (Human)
Chr.	Chromosome 19 (human)
Band	19p13.3	Start	1,554,672 bp
Band	19p13.3	End	1,568,325 bp

Gene location (Mouse)
Chr.	Chromosome 10 (mouse)
Band	10|10 C1	Start	80,216,189 bp
Band	10|10 C1	End	80,223,493 bp
RNA expression pattern
Bgee	Human / Mouse (ortholog); Top expressed in: right testis; left testis; ganglionic eminence; ventricular zone; secondary oocyte; stromal cell of endometrium; C1 segment; mucosa of transverse colon; sural nerve; left ovary / Top expressed in: seminiferous tubule; hand; medial ganglionic eminence; mandibular prominence; maxillary prominence; superior cervical ganglion; spermatid; endocardial cushion; Gonadal ridge; Rostral migratory stream; More reference expression data
BioGPS	n/a
Gene ontology
Molecular function	metal ion binding; nucleic acid binding; RNA binding; mRNA 3'-UTR AU-rich region binding
Cellular component	cytoplasm; perinuclear region of cytoplasm; nucleus
Biological process	mRNA destabilization; mRNA localization resulting in posttranscriptional regulation of gene expression
Sources:Amigo / QuickGO
Orthologs
Databases	NCBI: entry; OMA: entry
Species	Human	Mouse
Entrez	399664	237400
Ensembl	ENSG00000181588	ENSMUSG00000048696
UniProt	Q86XN8	Q3UE17
RefSeq (mRNA)	NM_001174118; NM_203304	NM_198615
RefSeq (protein)	NP_001167589; NP_976049	NP_941017
Location (UCSC)	Chr 19: 1.55 – 1.57 Mb	Chr 10: 80.22 – 80.22 Mb
PubMed search
- Wikidata
View/Edit Human	View/Edit Mouse

Mex-3 homolog D (C. elegans), also known as MEX3D, is a protein that in humans is encoded by the MEX3D gene.

== Function ==
MEX3D is an RNA binding protein that interacts with AU-rich elements of Bcl-2. Upon binding, MEX3D has a negative regulatory action on Bcl-2 expression at the posttranscriptional level.

== Structure ==
MEX3 proteins contain two N-terminal heterogeneous nuclear ribonucleoprotein K homology motifs (KH domain) and a RING domain at the C-terminus.
