= NOVA1 =

Protein-coding gene in the species Homo sapiens

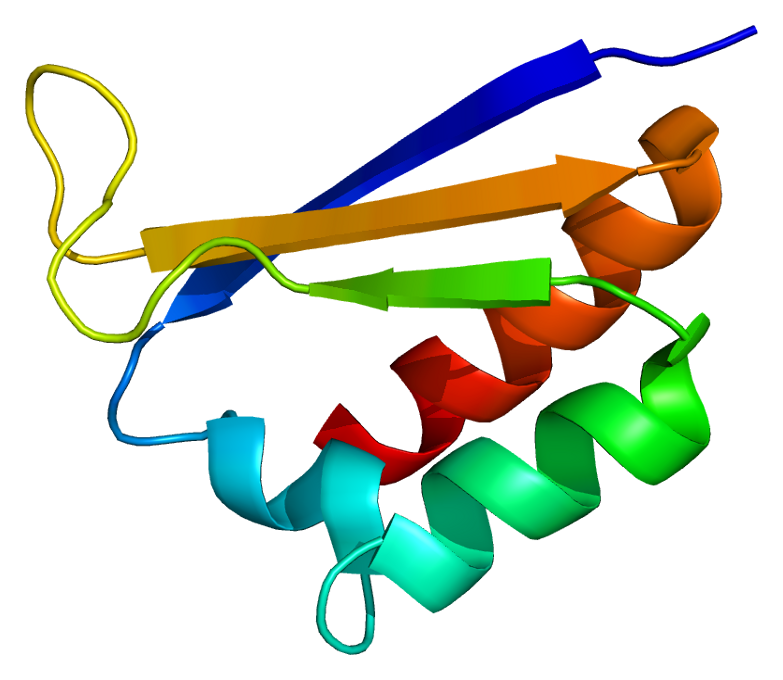

Identifiers
- Aliases: NOVA1, Nova-1, NOVA alternative splicing regulator 1
- External IDs: OMIM: 602157; MGI: 104297; GeneCards: NOVA1
Available structures
PDB	Ortholog search: PDBe RCSB
PDB	List of PDB id codes 1DT4, 2ANN, 2ANR

Gene location (Human)
Chr.	Chromosome 14 (human)
Band	14q12	Start	26,443,093 bp
Band	14q12	End	26,597,754 bp

Gene location (Mouse)
Chr.	Chromosome 12 (mouse)
Band	12 B3|12 21.46 cM	Start	46,694,517 bp
Band	12 B3|12 21.46 cM	End	46,818,929 bp
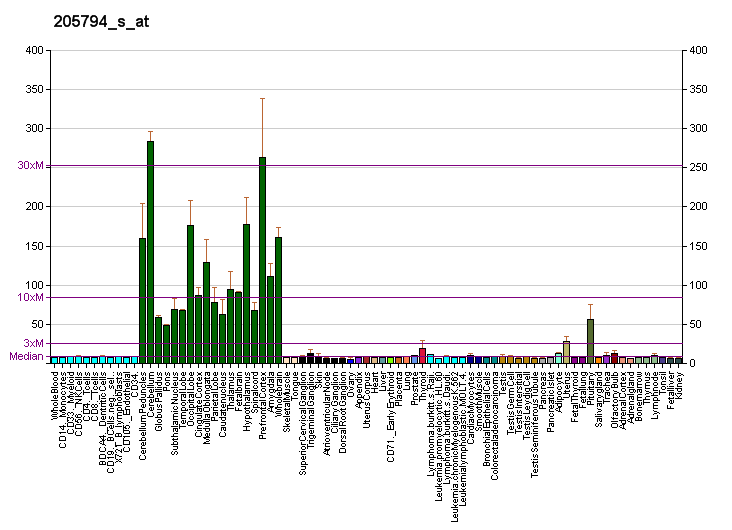

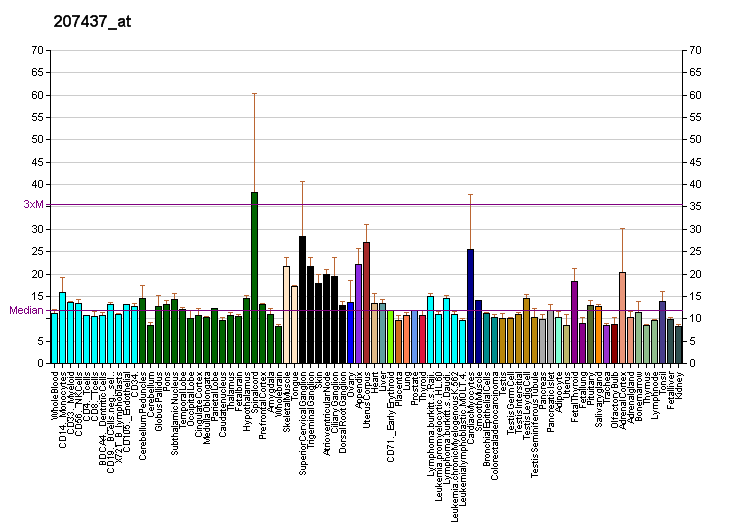
RNA expression pattern
Bgee	Human / Mouse (ortholog); Top expressed in: cerebellum; cerebellar hemisphere; C1 segment; hypothalamus; paraflocculus of cerebellum; Brodmann area 46; right hemisphere of cerebellum; prefrontal cortex; pons; synovial joint / Top expressed in: lumbar subsegment of spinal cord; dorsomedial hypothalamic nucleus; lateral hypothalamus; central gray substance of midbrain; paraventricular nucleus of hypothalamus; medial vestibular nucleus; cerebellar cortex; superior colliculus; deep cerebellar nuclei; inferior colliculi; More reference expression data
BioGPS	More reference expression data
Gene ontology
Molecular function	nucleic acid binding; mRNA binding; RNA binding; protein binding
Cellular component	nucleolus; intracellular membrane-bounded organelle; nucleus
Biological process	mRNA splicing, via spliceosome; RNA processing; locomotory behavior; RNA splicing; regulation of RNA metabolic process; chemical synaptic transmission; negative regulation of cold-induced thermogenesis
Sources:Amigo / QuickGO
Orthologs
Databases	NCBI: entry; OMA: entry
Species	Human	Mouse
Entrez	4857	664883
Ensembl	ENSG00000139910	ENSMUSG00000021047
UniProt	P51513	Q9JKN6
RefSeq (mRNA)	NM_002515; NM_006489; NM_006491	NM_021361; NM_001364634; NM_001364635; NM_001364636; NM_001364637 NM_001364638; NM_001364639
RefSeq (protein)	NP_002506; NP_006480; NP_006482; NP_001353319; NP_001353320 NP_001353321; NP_001353322; NP_001353323; NP_001353324; NP_001353325; NP_001353326; NP_001353327	NP_067336; NP_001351563; NP_001351564; NP_001351565; NP_001351566 NP_001351567; NP_001351568
Location (UCSC)	Chr 14: 26.44 – 26.6 Mb	Chr 12: 46.69 – 46.82 Mb
PubMed search
- Wikidata
View/Edit Human	View/Edit Mouse

RNA-binding protein Nova-1 is a protein that in humans is encoded by the NOVA1 gene.

This gene encodes a neuron-specific RNA-binding protein, a member of the Nova family of paraneoplastic disease antigens, that is recognized and inhibited by paraneoplastic antibodies. These antibodies are found in the sera of patients with paraneoplastic opsoclonus-ataxia, breast cancer, and small cell lung cancer. Alternatively spliced transcripts encoding distinct isoforms have been described. Both Neanderthals and Denisovans had one version and nearly all modern humans had another suggesting positive selection. Insertion of Neanderthal gene variant of the neuro-oncological ventral antigen 1 (NOVA1) gene into human cortical organoids might promote slower development and higher surface complexity in the brain models, but this may be an artefact of a CRISPR side effect, as it could not be replicated in a subsequent study.
