= DDX53 =

Protein-coding gene in humans

Identifiers
- Aliases: DDX53, CAGE, CT26, DEAD-box helicase 53
- External IDs: GeneCards: DDX53
Available structures
PDB	Human UniProt search: PDBe RCSB
PDB	List of PDB id codes 3IUY
Enzyme activity
EC #	BRENDA	ExPASy	KEGG	MetaCyc
3.6.4.13	↗	↗	↗	↗

Gene location (Human)
Chr.	X chromosome (human)
Band	Xp22.11	Start	22,999,960 bp
Band	Xp22.11	End	23,003,589 bp
RNA expression pattern
Bgee	Human / Mouse (ortholog); Top expressed in: gonad; testicle; sperm; right testis; left testis; human musculoskeletal system; muscular system; skeletal muscle; lower limb muscles; muscle of leg / n/a; More reference expression data
BioGPS	n/a
Gene ontology
Molecular function	ATP binding; hydrolase activity; nucleotide binding; nucleic acid binding; helicase activity; RNA binding
Cellular component	nucleus; nucleolus; cytoplasm
Biological process	RNA secondary structure unwinding
Sources:Amigo / QuickGO
Orthologs
Databases	NCBI: entry; OMA: entry
Species	Human	Mouse
Entrez	168400	n/a
Ensembl	ENSG00000184735	n/a
UniProt	Q86TM3	n/a
RefSeq (mRNA)	NM_182699	n/a
RefSeq (protein)	NP_874358	n/a
Location (UCSC)	Chr X: 23 – 23 Mb	n/a
PubMed search		n/a
- Wikidata
View/Edit Human

DEAD-box helicase 53 is a protein that in humans is encoded by the DDX53 gene.

== Function ==
This intronless gene encodes a protein which contains several domains found in members of the DEAD-box helicase protein family. Other members of this protein family participate in ATP-dependent RNA unwinding.

== Clinical significance ==
In 2024 it was found that variants of DDX53 is linked to Autism
