= DDX43 =

Gene on human chromosome 6

Identifiers
- Aliases: DDX43, CT13, HAGE, DEAD-box helicase 43
- External IDs: OMIM: 606286; MGI: 3642857; GeneCards: DDX43
Enzyme activity
EC #	BRENDA	ExPASy	KEGG	MetaCyc
3.6.4.13	↗	↗	↗	↗

Gene location (Human)
Chr.	Chromosome 6 (human)
Band	6q13	Start	73,394,828 bp
Band	6q13	End	73,417,566 bp

Gene location (Mouse)
Chr.	Chromosome 9 (mouse)
Band	9|9 E1	Start	78,303,059 bp
Band	9|9 E1	End	78,330,869 bp
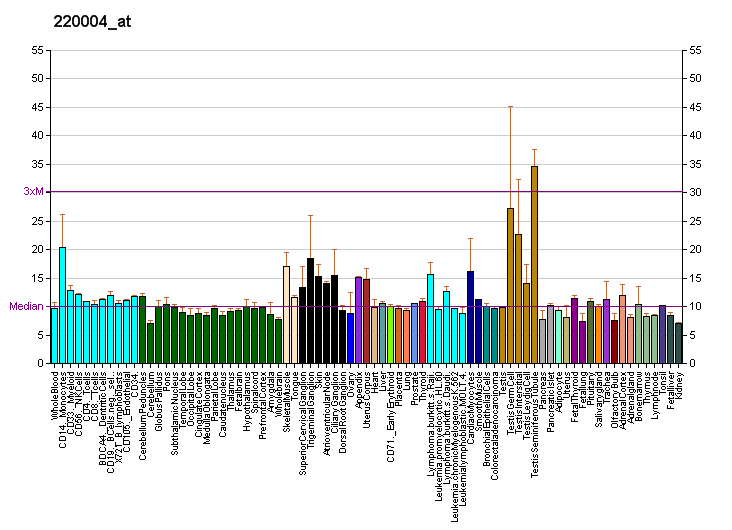
RNA expression pattern
Bgee	Human / Mouse (ortholog); Top expressed in: oocyte; secondary oocyte; gonad; testicle; sperm; right testis; left testis; Achilles tendon; granulocyte; gastric mucosa / Top expressed in: spermatocyte; seminiferous tubule; Gonadal ridge; spermatid; embryo; embryo; morula; zygote; blastocyst; conjunctival fornix; More reference expression data
BioGPS	More reference expression data
Gene ontology
Molecular function	ATP binding; hydrolase activity; nucleotide binding; nucleic acid binding; helicase activity; RNA binding
Cellular component	intracellular anatomical structure; nucleolus; cytoplasm
Biological process	RNA secondary structure unwinding
Sources:Amigo / QuickGO
Orthologs
Databases	NCBI: entry; OMA: entry
Species	Human	Mouse
Entrez	55510	100048658
Ensembl	ENSG00000080007	ENSMUSG00000070291
UniProt	Q9NXZ2	D3Z6P9
RefSeq (mRNA)	NM_018665	NM_001191044
RefSeq (protein)	NP_061135	NP_001177973
Location (UCSC)	Chr 6: 73.39 – 73.42 Mb	Chr 9: 78.3 – 78.33 Mb
PubMed search
- Wikidata
View/Edit Human	View/Edit Mouse

Probable ATP-dependent RNA helicase DDX43 is an enzyme that in humans is encoded by the DDX43 gene.

== Function ==
The protein encoded by this gene is an ATP-dependent RNA helicase in the DEAD box family and displays tumor-specific expression.
