= MEX3B =

Protein-coding gene in the species Homo sapiens

Identifiers
- Aliases: MEX3B, MEX-3B, RKHD3, RNF195, mex-3 RNA binding family member B
- External IDs: OMIM: 611008; MGI: 1918252; GeneCards: MEX3B

Gene location (Human)
Chr.	Chromosome 15 (human)
Band	15q25.2	Start	82,041,778 bp
Band	15q25.2	End	82,046,119 bp

Gene location (Mouse)
Chr.	Chromosome 7 (mouse)
Band	7 D3|7 47.35 cM	Start	82,516,541 bp
Band	7 D3|7 47.35 cM	End	82,520,723 bp
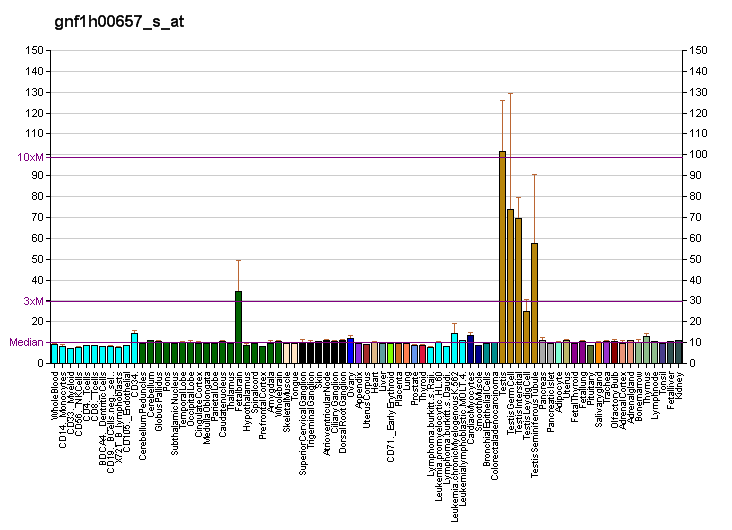

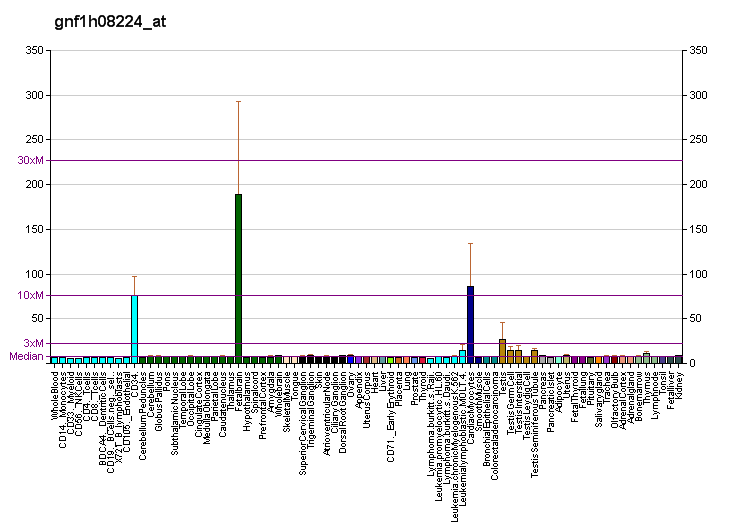
RNA expression pattern
Bgee	Human / Mouse (ortholog); Top expressed in: sperm; ganglionic eminence; right testis; left testis; ventricular zone; gonad; testicle; stromal cell of endometrium; canal of the cervix; ectocervix / Top expressed in: hand; medial ganglionic eminence; abdominal wall; vas deferens; mandibular prominence; Rostral migratory stream; primitive streak; maxillary prominence; ventricular zone; Gonadal ridge; More reference expression data
BioGPS	More reference expression data
Gene ontology
Molecular function	calcium ion binding; metal ion binding; nucleic acid binding; RNA binding
Cellular component	cytoplasm; P-body; nucleus; nucleoplasm; cytosol
Biological process	protein autophosphorylation; protein phosphorylation
Sources:Amigo / QuickGO
Orthologs
Databases	NCBI: entry; OMA: entry
Species	Human	Mouse
Entrez	84206	108797
Ensembl	ENSG00000183496	ENSMUSG00000057706
UniProt	Q6ZN04	Q69Z36
RefSeq (mRNA)	NM_032246	NM_175366
RefSeq (protein)	NP_115622	NP_780575
Location (UCSC)	Chr 15: 82.04 – 82.05 Mb	Chr 7: 82.52 – 82.52 Mb
PubMed search
- Wikidata
View/Edit Human	View/Edit Mouse

RNA-binding protein MEX3B is a protein that in humans is encoded by the MEX3B gene.
