= ASCC1 =

Protein-coding gene in the species Homo sapiens

Identifiers
- Aliases: ASCC1, ASC1p50, p50, CGI-18, SMABF2, activating signal cointegrator 1 complex subunit 1
- External IDs: OMIM: 614215; MGI: 1916340; GeneCards: ASCC1

Gene location (Human)
Chr.	Chromosome 10 (human)
Band	10q22.1	Start	72,096,032 bp
Band	10q22.1	End	72,217,134 bp

Gene location (Mouse)
Chr.	Chromosome 10 (mouse)
Band	10|10 B4	Start	59,838,627 bp
Band	10|10 B4	End	59,935,810 bp
RNA expression pattern
Bgee	Human / Mouse (ortholog); Top expressed in: Achilles tendon; ventricular zone; sperm; corpus callosum; C1 segment; islet of Langerhans; right adrenal gland; right adrenal cortex; testicle; ganglionic eminence / Top expressed in: right kidney; choroid plexus of fourth ventricle; human kidney; spermatid; proximal tubule; interventricular septum; muscle of thigh; nose; olfactory epithelium; seminiferous tubule; More reference expression data
BioGPS	n/a
Gene ontology
Molecular function	protein binding; RNA binding
Cellular component	nucleoplasm; transcription regulator complex; neuromuscular junction; nucleus; nuclear speck
Biological process	DNA dealkylation involved in DNA repair; regulation of transcription, DNA-templated; transcription, DNA-templated; DNA repair; cellular response to DNA damage stimulus
Sources:Amigo / QuickGO
Orthologs
Databases	NCBI: entry; OMA: entry
Species	Human	Mouse
Entrez	51008	69090
Ensembl	ENSG00000138303	ENSMUSG00000044475
UniProt	Q8N9N2	Q9D8Z1
RefSeq (mRNA)	NM_001198798; NM_001198799; NM_001198800; NM_015947	NM_001199187; NM_026937
RefSeq (protein)	NP_001185727; NP_001185728; NP_001185729; NP_001356014; NP_001356015 NP_001356016; NP_001356017; NP_001356018; NP_001356019; NP_001356020; NP_001356021; NP_001356022; NP_001356023; NP_001356024; NP_001356025; NP_001356026; NP_001356027; NP_001356028; NP_001356029; NP_001356030; NP_001356031; NP_001356032; NP_001356033; NP_001356034; NP_001356035; NP_001356036; NP_001356037; NP_001356038; NP_001356039; NP_001356040; NP_001356041	NP_001186116; NP_081213
Location (UCSC)	Chr 10: 72.1 – 72.22 Mb	Chr 10: 59.84 – 59.94 Mb
PubMed search
- Wikidata
View/Edit Human	View/Edit Mouse

Activating signal cointegrator 1 complex subunit 1 (ASCC1) is a protein that in humans is encoded by the ASCC1 gene.
