= KHDRBS1 =

Protein-coding gene in humans

Identifiers
- Aliases: KHDRBS1, Sam68, p62, p68, KH domain containing, RNA binding, signal transduction associated 1, KH RNA binding domain containing, signal transduction associated 1
- External IDs: OMIM: 602489; MGI: 893579; GeneCards: KHDRBS1
Available structures
PDB	Ortholog search: PDBe RCSB
PDB	List of PDB id codes 2XA6, 3QHE

Gene location (Human)
Chr.	Chromosome 1 (human)
Band	1p35.2	Start	32,013,868 bp
Band	1p35.2	End	32,060,850 bp

Gene location (Mouse)
Chr.	Chromosome 4 (mouse)
Band	4|4 D2.2	Start	129,596,957 bp
Band	4|4 D2.2	End	129,636,096 bp
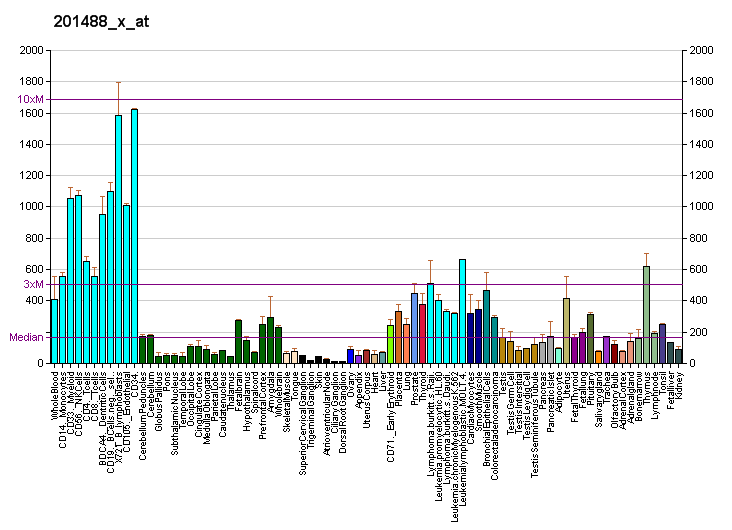

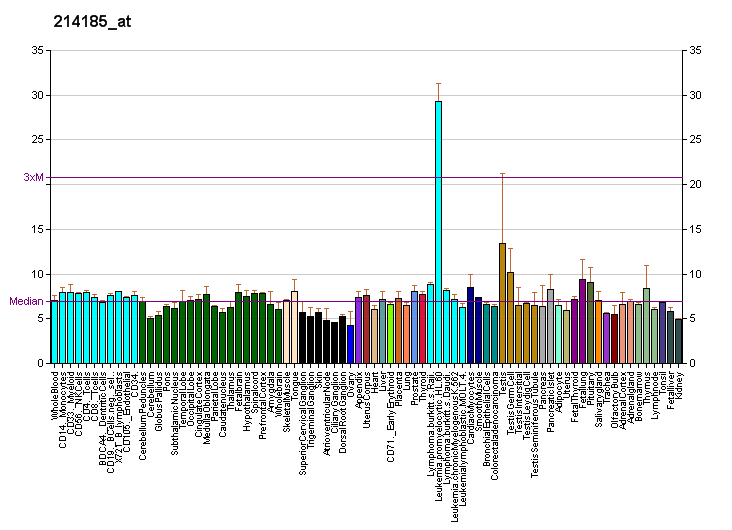
RNA expression pattern
Bgee	Human / Mouse (ortholog); Top expressed in: germinal epithelium; ganglionic eminence; parietal pleura; tendon of biceps brachii; visceral pleura; ventricular zone; superficial temporal artery; mucosa of paranasal sinus; gingival epithelium; lower lobe of lung / Top expressed in: mandibular prominence; maxillary prominence; ganglionic eminence; medial ganglionic eminence; somite; primitive streak; abdominal wall; ventricular zone; human fetus; atrium; More reference expression data
BioGPS	More reference expression data
Gene ontology
Molecular function	DNA binding; poly(A) binding; poly(U) RNA binding; SH3 domain binding; protein-containing complex binding; protein binding; RNA binding; nucleic acid binding; protein domain specific binding; identical protein binding
Cellular component	cytoplasm; Grb2-Sos complex; membrane; nucleus; cytosol; nucleoplasm
Biological process	regulation of transcription, DNA-templated; regulation of protein stability; transcription, DNA-templated; positive regulation of RNA export from nucleus; cell surface receptor signaling pathway; G2/M transition of mitotic cell cycle; regulation of RNA export from nucleus; cell cycle; cell population proliferation; negative regulation of transcription, DNA-templated; positive regulation of translational initiation; signal transduction; mRNA processing; positive regulation of signal transduction; regulation of mRNA splicing, via spliceosome; spermatogenesis; protein complex oligomerization; regulation of alternative mRNA splicing, via spliceosome; G1/S transition of mitotic cell cycle
Sources:Amigo / QuickGO
Orthologs
Databases	NCBI: entry; OMA: entry
Species	Human	Mouse
Entrez	10657	20218
Ensembl	ENSG00000121774	ENSMUSG00000028790
UniProt	Q07666	Q60749
RefSeq (mRNA)	NM_001271878; NM_006559	NM_011317
RefSeq (protein)	NP_001258807; NP_006550	NP_035447
Location (UCSC)	Chr 1: 32.01 – 32.06 Mb	Chr 4: 129.6 – 129.64 Mb
PubMed search
- Wikidata
View/Edit Human	View/Edit Mouse

KH domain-containing, RNA-binding, signal transduction-associated protein 1 is a protein that in humans is encoded by the KHDRBS1 gene.

This gene encodes a member of the K homology domain-containing, RNA-binding, signal transduction-associated protein family. The encoded protein appears to have many functions and may be involved in a variety of cellular processes, including alternative splicing, cell cycle regulation, RNA 3'-end formation, tumorigenesis, and regulation of human immunodeficiency virus gene expression.

== Function ==
Sam68 (the Src-Associated substrate in Mitosis of 68 kDa) is officially called KHDRBS1 (KH domain containing, RNA binding, signal transduction associated 1). Sam68 is a KH-type RNA binding protein that recognizes U(U/A)AA direct repeats with relative high affinity. Sam68 is predominantly nuclear and its major function in the nucleus is to regulate alternative splicing by recognizing RNA sequences neighboring the included/excluded exon(s).

== Clinical significance ==
Sam68 influences the alternative splicing of a number of genes central to processes such as neurogenesis and adipogenesis as well as diseases such as spinal muscular atrophy (SMA) and cancer.

=== Neurogenesis ===
Sam68 was demonstrated to be involved in the alternative splicing of mRNAs implicated in normal neurogenesis using splicing-sensitive microarrays. Sam68 was also shown to participate in the epithelial-to-mesenchymal transition by regulating the alternative splicing of SF2/ASF. Sam68 was shown to regulate the activity-dependent alternative splicing of the neurexin-1 in the central nervous system with implications for neurodevelopment disorders.

=== Adipogenesis ===
Sam68 influences alternative splicing of the mTOR kinase contributing to the lean phenotype observed in the Sam68 deficient mice.

=== Spinal muscular atrophy ===
The role of Sam68 was further highlighted in spinal muscular atrophy (SMA), as Sam68 promotes the skipping of exon 7 leading to a non-functional SMN2 protein.

=== Cancer ===
Sam68 regulates the alternative splicing of a number of cancer-related genes.

Direct evidence for the involvement of Sam68 in alternative splicing has been shown in promoting the inclusion of the variable exon 5 (v5) in CD44 correlating with cell migration potential. CD44 is a cell surface protein whose expression has been linked to cancer, with its expression predicting prognosis in a number of tumour types. In prostate cancer, Sam68 also interacts with splicing complex proteins KHDRBS3 (T-STAR) and Metadherin (MTDH) which also alter CD44 splicing. Subsequently, the knockdown of Sam68 has been shown to delay LNCaP prostate cancer cells proliferation.

In addition, Sam68 in conjunction with hnRNPA1 influences the choice of the alternative 5' splice sites of Bcl-x regulating pro-survival and apoptotic pathways.

The RNA binding activity of Sam68 is regulated by post-translational modifications such that Sam68 is often referred to as a STAR (Signal Transduction Activator of RNA) protein by which signals from growth factors or soluble tyrosine kinases, such as Src family kinases, act to regulate cellular RNA processes such as alternative splicing. For example, the Sam68-dependent CD44 alternative splicing of exon v5 is regulated by ERK phosphorylation of Sam68 and Bcl-x alternative splicing is regulated by the p59fyn-dependent phosphorylation of Sam68.

Sam68 is also downstream of the epidermal growth factor receptor (EGFR), hepatocyte growth factor (HGF)/Met receptor (c-Met), leptin and tumor necrosis factor (TNF) receptors. While the role of Sam68 in these pathways is slowly emerging much remains to be determined. Sam68 has also been shown to re-localize in the cytoplasm near the plasma membrane, where it functions to transport and regulate the translation of certain mRNAs and regulates cell migration.

The many roles of Sam68 in cancer have been reviewed by Bielli et al.,.

== Gene knockout studies ==
Sam68-deficient mice were generated by targeted disruption of exons 4-5 of the sam68 gene, which encode the functional region of the KH domain. The genotypes of the offspring from heterozygote intercrosses exhibited a Mendelian segregation at E18.5. Despite the lack of visible deformity, many of the Sam68-/- pups died at birth of unknown causes. Sam68+/- mice were phenotypically normal and Sam68-/- pups that survived the peri-natal period invariably lived to old age. Sam68-/- mice weighed less than Sam68+/+ littermates and magnetic resonance imaging analysis confirmed that young Sam68-/- mice exhibited a profound reduction in adiposity, although food intake was similar. Moreover, Sam68-/- mice were protected against dietary-induced obesity. Sam68 deficient preadipocytes (3T3-L1 cells) had impaired adipogenesis and Sam68-/- mice had ~45% less adult derived stem cells (ADSCs) in their stromal vascular fraction (SVF) from WAT.

=== Tumour formation in vivo ===
Sam68-/- mice did not develop tumors and showed no immunological or other major illnesses. Sam68-/- mice did, however, have difficulty breeding due to male infertility and female subfertility. The Sam68-null mice exhibited motor coordination defects and fell from the rotating drum at lower speeds and prematurely compared to the wild-type controls. Sam68-/- mice are protected against age-induced osteoporosis. Using the mammary tumor virus-polyoma middle T-antigen (MMTV-PyMT) mouse model of mammary tumorigenesis, it was shown that reduced Sam68 expression decreases tumor burden and metastasis. Kaplan-Meier curves showed that loss of one sam68 allele (PyMT; Sam68+/-) was associated with a significant delay in the onset of palpable tumors and a significant reduction in tumor multiplicity. These findings suggest that Sam68 is required for PyMT-induced mammary tumorigenesis. The knockdown of Sam68 expression in PyMT-derived mammary cells reduced the number of lung tumor foci in athymic mice, suggesting that Sam68 is also required for mammary tumor metastasis.
