= TDRKH =

Protein-coding gene in humans

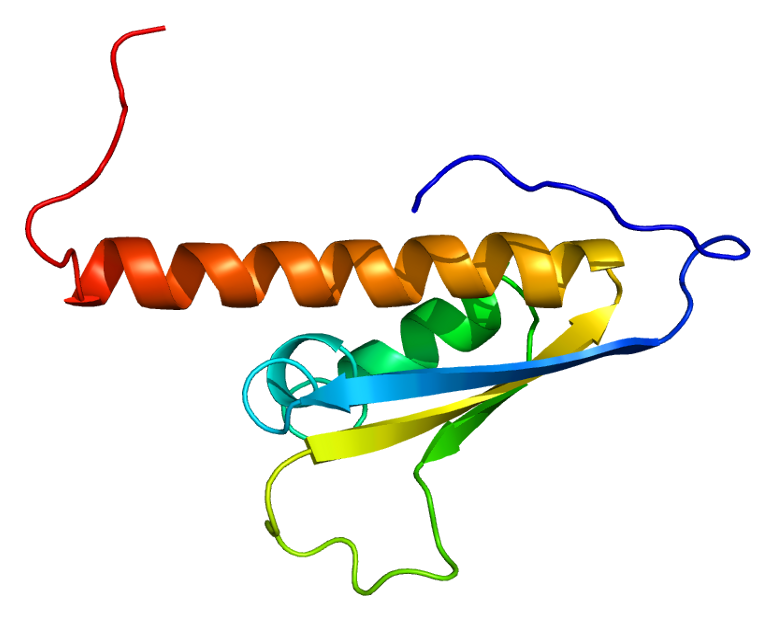

Identifiers
- Aliases: TDRKH, TDRD2, tudor and KH domain containing
- External IDs: OMIM: 609501; MGI: 1919884; GeneCards: TDRKH
Available structures
PDB	Ortholog search: PDBe RCSB
PDB	List of PDB id codes 2DIQ, 3FDR, 5J39

Gene location (Human)
Chr.	Chromosome 1 (human)
Band	1q21.3	Start	151,770,107 bp
Band	1q21.3	End	151,791,416 bp

Gene location (Mouse)
Chr.	Chromosome 3 (mouse)
Band	3|3 F2.1	Start	94,320,580 bp
Band	3|3 F2.1	End	94,341,975 bp
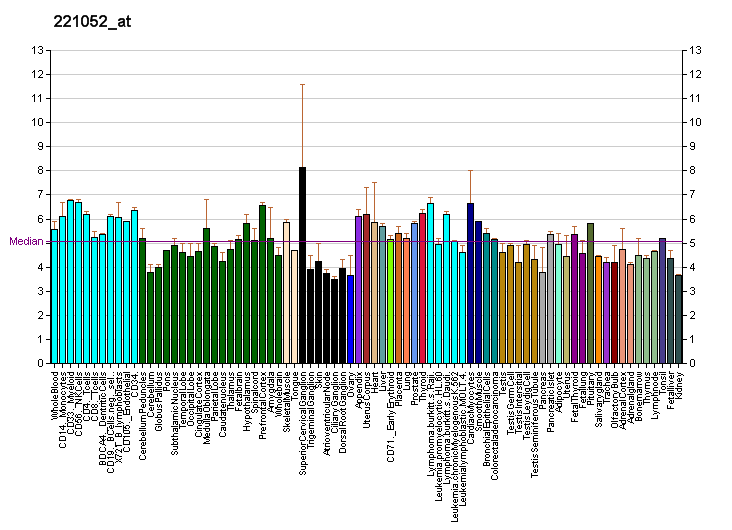

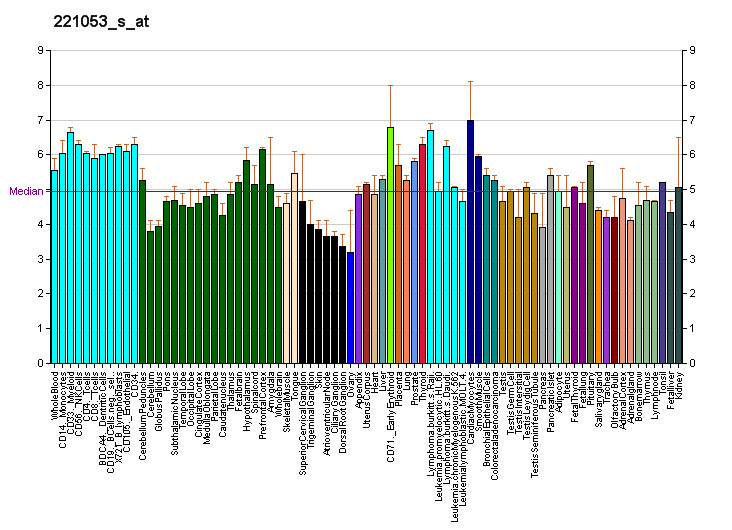
RNA expression pattern
Bgee	Human / Mouse (ortholog); Top expressed in: gonad; right testis; left testis; cerebellar hemisphere; right hemisphere of cerebellum; testicle; prefrontal cortex; ganglionic eminence; secondary oocyte; right frontal lobe / Top expressed in: neural layer of retina; zygote; ventricular zone; primary oocyte; lens; secondary oocyte; dentate gyrus of hippocampal formation granule cell; neural tube; ganglionic eminence; otolith organ; More reference expression data
BioGPS	More reference expression data
Gene ontology
Molecular function	RNA binding; nucleic acid binding
Cellular component	cytoplasm; pi-body; mitochondrion; piP-body
Biological process	male meiotic nuclear division; fertilization; cell differentiation; DNA methylation involved in gamete generation; spermatogenesis; gene silencing; piRNA metabolic process
Sources:Amigo / QuickGO
Orthologs
Databases	NCBI: entry; OMA: entry
Species	Human	Mouse
Entrez	11022	72634
Ensembl	ENSG00000182134	ENSMUSG00000041912
UniProt	Q9Y2W6	Q80VL1
RefSeq (mRNA)	NM_001083963; NM_001083964; NM_001083965; NM_006862	NM_028307; NM_001357711; NM_001357712; NM_001357713; NM_001357714
RefSeq (protein)	NP_001077432; NP_001077433; NP_001077434; NP_006853	NP_082583; NP_001344640; NP_001344641; NP_001344642; NP_001344643
Location (UCSC)	Chr 1: 151.77 – 151.79 Mb	Chr 3: 94.32 – 94.34 Mb
PubMed search
- Wikidata
View/Edit Human	View/Edit Mouse

Tudor and KH domain-containing protein is a protein that in humans is encoded by the TDRKH gene.
