= HDLBP =

Protein-coding gene in the species Homo sapiens

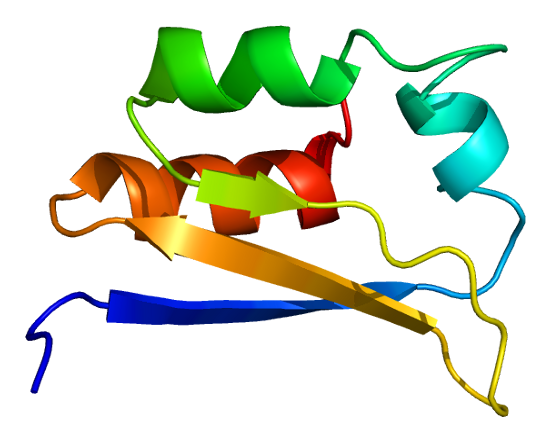
Available structures
PDB	Ortholog search: PDBe RCSB
PDB	List of PDB id codes 1VIG, 1VIH, 2CTE, 2CTF, 2CTJ, 2CTK, 2CTL, 2CTM

Identifiers
- Aliases: HDLBP, HBP, PRO2900, VGL, high density lipoprotein binding protein
- External IDs: OMIM: 142695; MGI: 99256; HomoloGene: 38035; GeneCards: HDLBP; OMA:HDLBP - orthologs

Gene location (Human)
Chr.	Chromosome 2 (human)
Band	2q37.3	Start	241,227,264 bp
Band	2q37.3	End	241,317,061 bp

Gene location (Mouse)
Chr.	Chromosome 1 (mouse)
Band	1 D|1 47.24 cM	Start	93,333,662 bp
Band	1 D|1 47.24 cM	End	93,406,537 bp
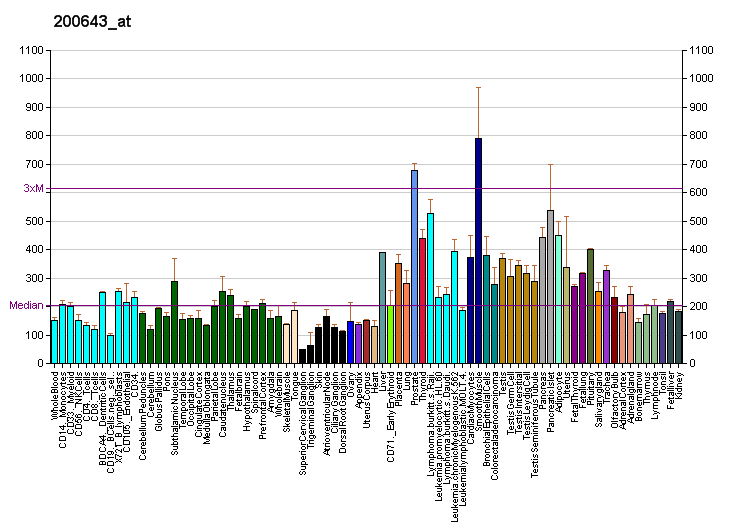

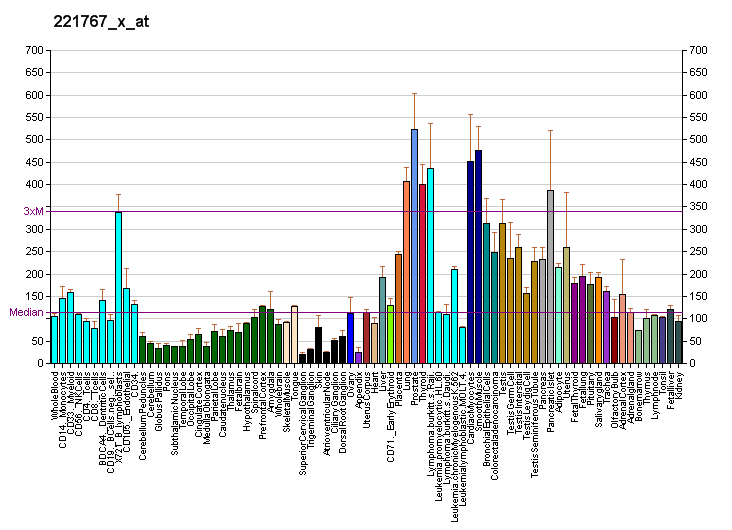
RNA expression pattern
Bgee	Human / Mouse (ortholog); Top expressed in: stromal cell of endometrium; body of pancreas; Achilles tendon; anterior pituitary; left testis; epithelium of colon; right testis; right lobe of thyroid gland; muscle of thigh; body of stomach / Top expressed in: tail of embryo; lacrimal gland; genital tubercle; calvaria; salivary gland; parotid gland; molar; muscle of thigh; gastrula; ankle; More reference expression data
BioGPS	More reference expression data
Gene ontology
Molecular function	protein binding; lipid binding; nucleic acid binding; RNA binding; cadherin binding
Cellular component	plasma membrane; nucleus; high-density lipoprotein particle; cytoplasm; cytosol
Biological process	lipid metabolism; steroid metabolic process; lipid transport; cholesterol metabolic process; high-density lipoprotein particle clearance; transport
Sources:Amigo / QuickGO
Orthologs
Species	Human	Mouse
Entrez	3069	110611
Ensembl	ENSG00000115677	ENSMUSG00000034088
UniProt	Q00341	Q8VDJ3
RefSeq (mRNA)	NM_001243900; NM_005336; NM_203346; NM_001320965; NM_001320966 NM_001320967	NM_001301364; NM_133808; NM_001357556
RefSeq (protein)	NP_001230829; NP_001307894; NP_001307895; NP_001307896; NP_005327 NP_976221	NP_001288293; NP_598569; NP_001344485
Location (UCSC)	Chr 2: 241.23 – 241.32 Mb	Chr 1: 93.33 – 93.41 Mb
PubMed search
- Wikidata
View/Edit Human	View/Edit Mouse

Vigilin is a 110 kDa protein that in humans is encoded by the HDLBP gene.
