= NOVA2 =

Protein-coding gene in the species Homo sapiens

Available structures
PDB	Ortholog search: PDBe RCSB
PDB	List of PDB id codes 1DTJ, 1EC6

Identifiers
- Aliases: NOVA2, ANOVA, NOVA3, NOVA alternative splicing regulator 2, NEDASB, NOVA-2
- External IDs: OMIM: 601991; MGI: 104296; HomoloGene: 134398; GeneCards: NOVA2; OMA:NOVA2 - orthologs

Gene location (Human)
Chr.	Chromosome 19 (human)
Band	19q13.32	Start	45,933,734 bp
Band	19q13.32	End	45,974,044 bp

Gene location (Mouse)
Chr.	Chromosome 7 (mouse)
Band	7|7 A3	Start	18,659,813 bp
Band	7|7 A3	End	18,699,244 bp
RNA expression pattern
Bgee	Human / Mouse (ortholog); Top expressed in: ganglionic eminence; tendon of biceps brachii; entorhinal cortex; postcentral gyrus; prefrontal cortex; superior frontal gyrus; right frontal lobe; nucleus accumbens; internal globus pallidus; Brodmann area 10 / Top expressed in: Rostral migratory stream; lumbar subsegment of spinal cord; ganglionic eminence; visual cortex; dentate gyrus of hippocampal formation granule cell; primary visual cortex; superior frontal gyrus; nucleus of stria terminalis; medial ganglionic eminence; central gray substance of midbrain; More reference expression data
BioGPS	n/a
Gene ontology
Molecular function	nucleic acid binding; RNA binding
Cellular component	nucleus
Biological process	mRNA splicing, via spliceosome; regulation of RNA metabolic process; negative regulation of cold-induced thermogenesis
Sources:Amigo / QuickGO
Orthologs
Species	Human	Mouse
Entrez	4858	384569
Ensembl	ENSG00000104967	ENSMUSG00000030411
UniProt	Q9UNW9	A0A1W2P872
RefSeq (mRNA)	NM_002516	NM_001029877
RefSeq (protein)	NP_002507	NP_001025048
Location (UCSC)	Chr 19: 45.93 – 45.97 Mb	Chr 7: 18.66 – 18.7 Mb
PubMed search
- Wikidata
View/Edit Human	View/Edit Mouse

NOVA alternative splicing regulator 2 is a protein that in humans is encoded by the NOVA2 gene.
