= Far upstream element–binding protein 1 =

Protein found in humans

FUBP1
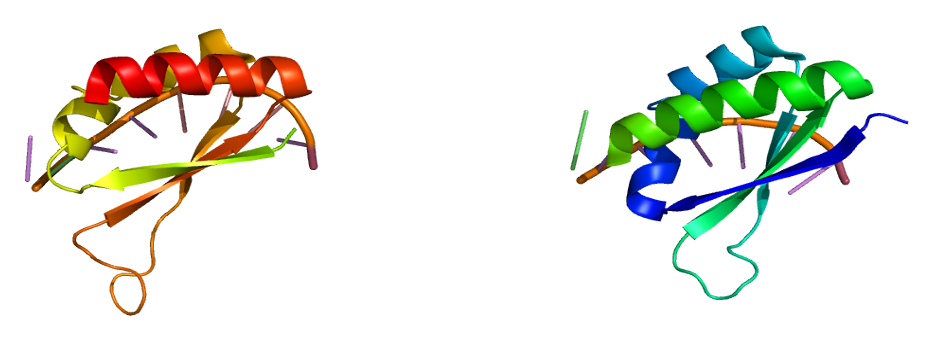

Identifiers
- Aliases: FUBP1, FBP, FUBP, hDH V, far upstream element binding protein 1
- External IDs: OMIM: 603444; MGI: 1196294; GeneCards: FUBP1
Available structures
PDB	Ortholog search: PDBe RCSB
PDB	List of PDB id codes 1J4W, 2KXH, 4LIJ

Gene location (Human)
Chr.	Chromosome 1 (human)
Band	1p31.1	Start	77,944,055 bp
Band	1p31.1	End	77,979,110 bp

Gene location (Mouse)
Chr.	Chromosome 3 (mouse)
Band	3 H3|3 77.05 cM	Start	151,916,059 bp
Band	3 H3|3 77.05 cM	End	151,942,463 bp
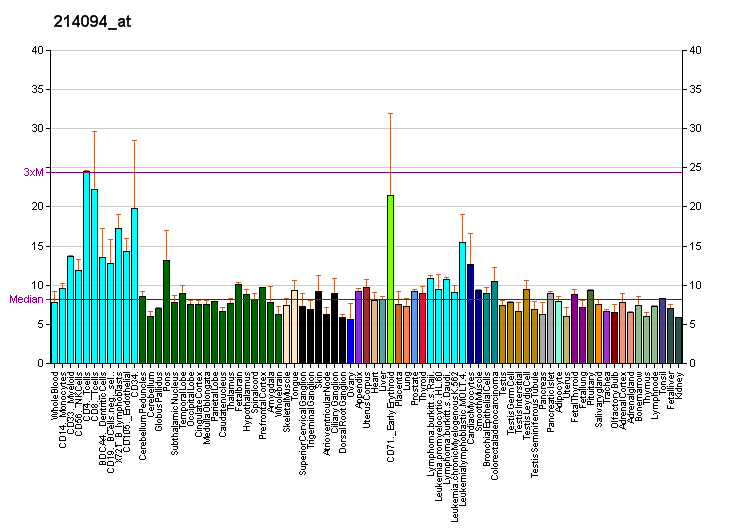

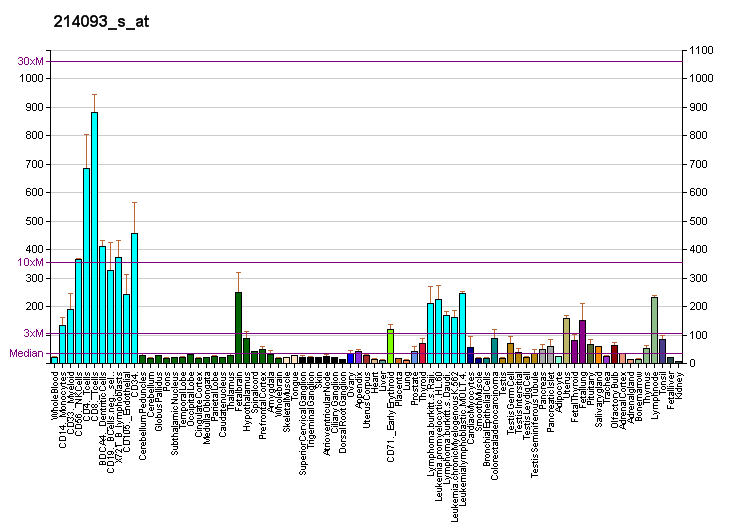

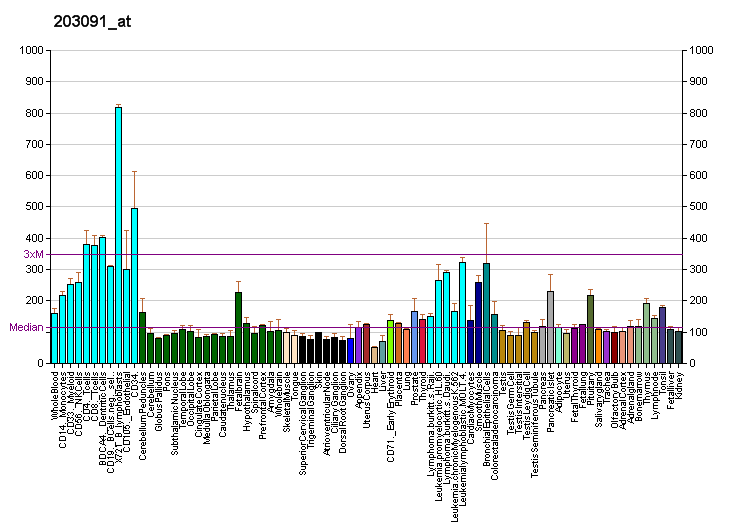
RNA expression pattern
Bgee	Human / Mouse (ortholog); Top expressed in: ventricular zone; ganglionic eminence; Achilles tendon; left ovary; right uterine tube; right ovary; body of uterus; left lobe of thyroid gland; right lobe of thyroid gland; canal of the cervix / Top expressed in: genital tubercle; tail of embryo; ventricular zone; maxillary prominence; mandibular prominence; epiblast; somite; abdominal wall; ganglionic eminence; Rostral migratory stream; More reference expression data
BioGPS	More reference expression data
Gene ontology
Molecular function	protein binding; nucleic acid binding; single-stranded DNA binding; DNA-binding transcription factor activity; DNA binding; RNA binding
Cellular component	nucleus; nucleoplasm
Biological process	positive regulation of gene expression; regulation of transcription, DNA-templated; transcription by RNA polymerase II; transcription, DNA-templated
Sources:Amigo / QuickGO
Orthologs
Databases	NCBI: entry; OMA: entry
Species	Human	Mouse
Entrez	8880	51886
Ensembl	ENSG00000162613	ENSMUSG00000028034
UniProt	Q96AE4	Q91WJ8
RefSeq (mRNA)	NM_001303433; NM_003902; NM_001376055; NM_001376056; NM_001376057	NM_057172; NM_001355366; NM_001355367; NM_001355368; NM_001355369 NM_001355370; NM_001355371; NM_001355372; NM_001355373; NM_001355374
RefSeq (protein)	NP_001290362; NP_003893; NP_001362984; NP_001362985; NP_001362986	NP_476513; NP_001342295; NP_001342296; NP_001342297; NP_001342298 NP_001342299; NP_001342300; NP_001342301; NP_001342302; NP_001342303
Location (UCSC)	Chr 1: 77.94 – 77.98 Mb	Chr 3: 151.92 – 151.94 Mb
PubMed search
- Wikidata
View/Edit Human	View/Edit Mouse

Far upstream element-binding protein 1 is a protein that in humans is encoded by the FUBP1 gene.

This gene encodes a ssDNA binding protein that activates the far upstream element (FUSE) of c-myc and stimulates expression of c-myc in undifferentiated cells. Regulation of FUSE by FUBP occurs through single-strand binding of FUBP to the non-coding strand. This protein has been shown to function as an ATP-dependent DNA helicase.

== Interactions ==
Far upstream element-binding protein 1 has been shown to interact with MAPK14 and SMN1.

== Clinical significance ==
FUBP1 gene deletion forms part of the 1p/19q codeletion mutation seen in oligodendroglioma, a form of primary brain tumour. CIC gene is also lost in the 1p/19q codeletion mutation.
