= PNO1 =

Protein-coding gene in the species Homo sapiens

Identifiers
- Aliases: PNO1, KHRBP1, RRP20, partner of NOB1 homolog
- External IDs: MGI: 1913499; GeneCards: PNO1

Gene location (Human)
Chr.	Chromosome 2 (human)
Band	2p14	Start	68,157,888 bp
Band	2p14	End	68,176,238 bp

Gene location (Mouse)
Chr.	Chromosome 11 (mouse)
Band	11|11 A2	Start	17,153,198 bp
Band	11|11 A2	End	17,161,568 bp
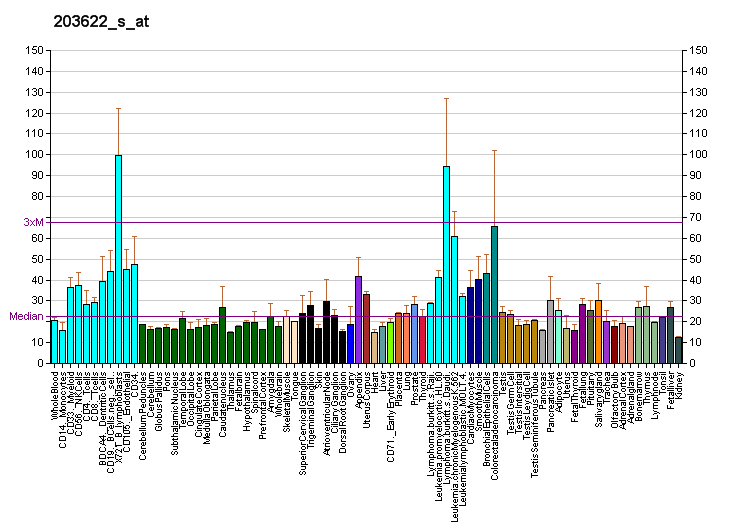

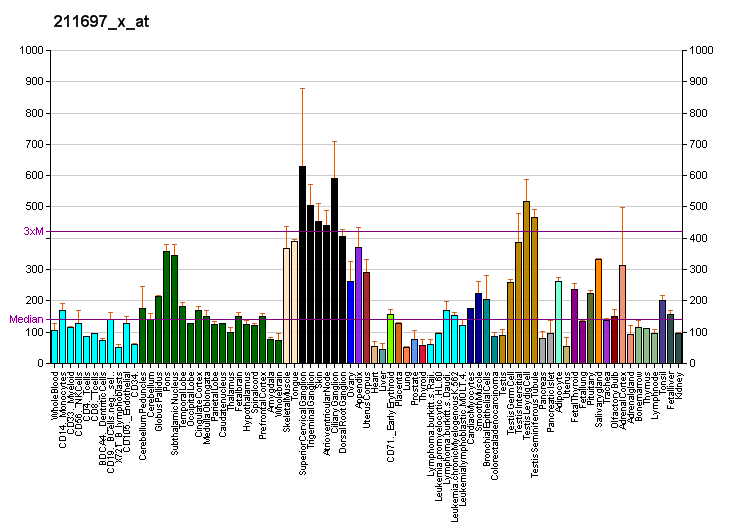
RNA expression pattern
Bgee	Human / Mouse (ortholog); Top expressed in: buccal mucosa cell; tendon of biceps brachii; olfactory bulb; thoracic diaphragm; beta cell; internal globus pallidus; mucosa of urinary bladder; cartilage tissue; triceps brachii muscle; right ventricle / Top expressed in: plantaris muscle; epiblast; extensor digitorum longus muscle; interventricular septum; embryo; primitive streak; cardiac muscle tissue of left ventricle; sternocleidomastoid muscle; upper arm; triceps brachii muscle; More reference expression data
BioGPS	More reference expression data
Gene ontology
Molecular function	nucleic acid binding; RNA binding
Cellular component	nucleus; nucleolus; cytosol; nucleoplasm
Biological process	rRNA processing
Sources:Amigo / QuickGO
Orthologs
Databases	NCBI: entry; OMA: entry
Species	Human	Mouse
Entrez	56902	66249
Ensembl	ENSG00000115946	ENSMUSG00000020116
UniProt	Q9NRX1	Q9CPS7
RefSeq (mRNA)	NM_001329916; NM_001329917; NM_020143	NM_025443
RefSeq (protein)	NP_001316845; NP_001316846; NP_064528	NP_079719
Location (UCSC)	Chr 2: 68.16 – 68.18 Mb	Chr 11: 17.15 – 17.16 Mb
PubMed search
- Wikidata
View/Edit Human	View/Edit Mouse

RNA-binding protein PNO1 is a protein that in humans is encoded by the PNO1 gene.
