= KHSRP =

Protein-coding gene in the species Homo sapiens

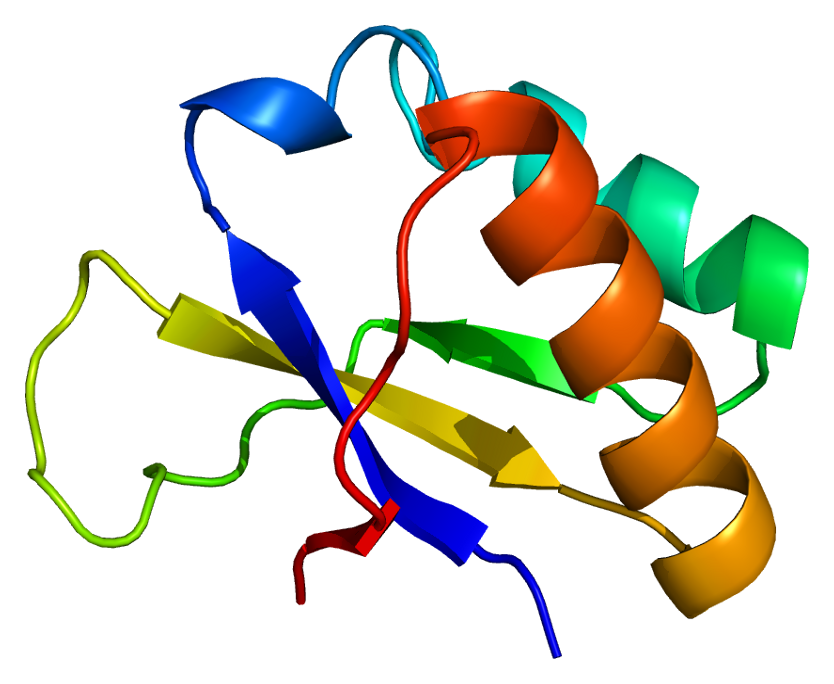
Available structures
PDB	Ortholog search: PDBe RCSB
PDB	List of PDB id codes 2HH2, 2HH3, 2JVZ, 2OPU, 2OPV, 4B8T

Identifiers
- Aliases: KHSRP, FBP2, FUBP2, KSRP, KH-type splicing regulatory protein, p75
- External IDs: OMIM: 603445; MGI: 1336214; HomoloGene: 2734; GeneCards: KHSRP; OMA:KHSRP - orthologs

Gene location (Human)
Chr.	Chromosome 19 (human)
Band	19p13.3	Start	6,413,102 bp
Band	19p13.3	End	6,424,811 bp

Gene location (Mouse)
Chr.	Chromosome 17 (mouse)
Band	17 D|17 29.63 cM	Start	57,328,051 bp
Band	17 D|17 29.63 cM	End	57,338,522 bp
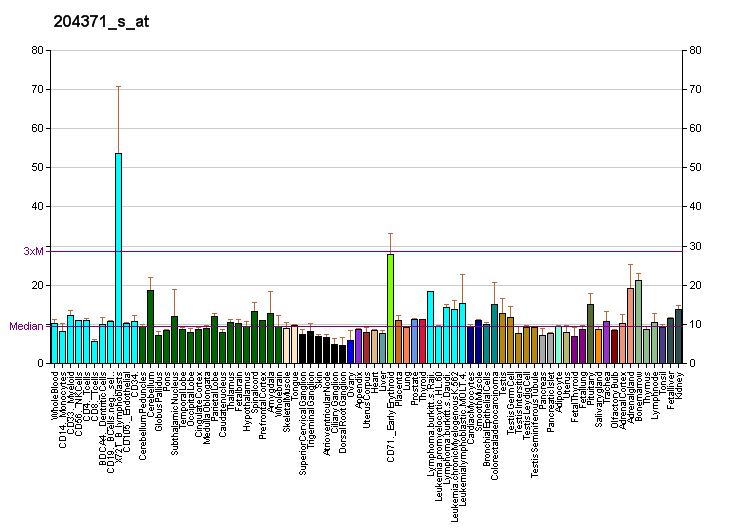
RNA expression pattern
Bgee	Human / Mouse (ortholog); Top expressed in: ventricular zone; ganglionic eminence; body of uterus; right hemisphere of cerebellum; left ovary; right ovary; canal of the cervix; right testis; right uterine tube; left testis / Top expressed in: ventricular zone; zygote; tail of embryo; hand; neural layer of retina; yolk sac; genital tubercle; secondary oocyte; lip; primary visual cortex; More reference expression data
BioGPS	More reference expression data
Gene ontology
Molecular function	DNA binding; protein binding; nucleic acid binding; mRNA binding; mRNA 3'-UTR AU-rich region binding; RNA binding
Cellular component	cytoplasm; cytosol; membrane; nucleoplasm; cytoplasmic stress granule; nucleus; exosome (RNase complex)
Biological process	mRNA transport; regulation of transcription, DNA-templated; mRNA catabolic process; RNA splicing, via transesterification reactions; mRNA processing; transcription, DNA-templated; regulation of miRNA metabolic process; RNA splicing; cellular response to cytokine stimulus; negative regulation of nitric oxide biosynthetic process; positive regulation of mRNA catabolic process; 3'-UTR-mediated mRNA destabilization; regulation of mRNA stability; miRNA metabolic process; transport; negative regulation of low-density lipoprotein particle clearance
Sources:Amigo / QuickGO
Orthologs
Species	Human	Mouse
Entrez	8570	16549
Ensembl	ENSG00000088247	ENSMUSG00000007670
UniProt	Q92945	Q3U0V1
RefSeq (mRNA)	NM_003685; NM_001366299; NM_001366300	NM_010613
RefSeq (protein)	NP_003676; NP_001353228; NP_001353229	NP_034743
Location (UCSC)	Chr 19: 6.41 – 6.42 Mb	Chr 17: 57.33 – 57.34 Mb
PubMed search
- Wikidata
View/Edit Human	View/Edit Mouse

Far upstream element-binding protein 2 is a protein that in humans is encoded by the KHSRP gene.
