= KHDRBS3 =

Protein-coding gene in the species Homo sapiens

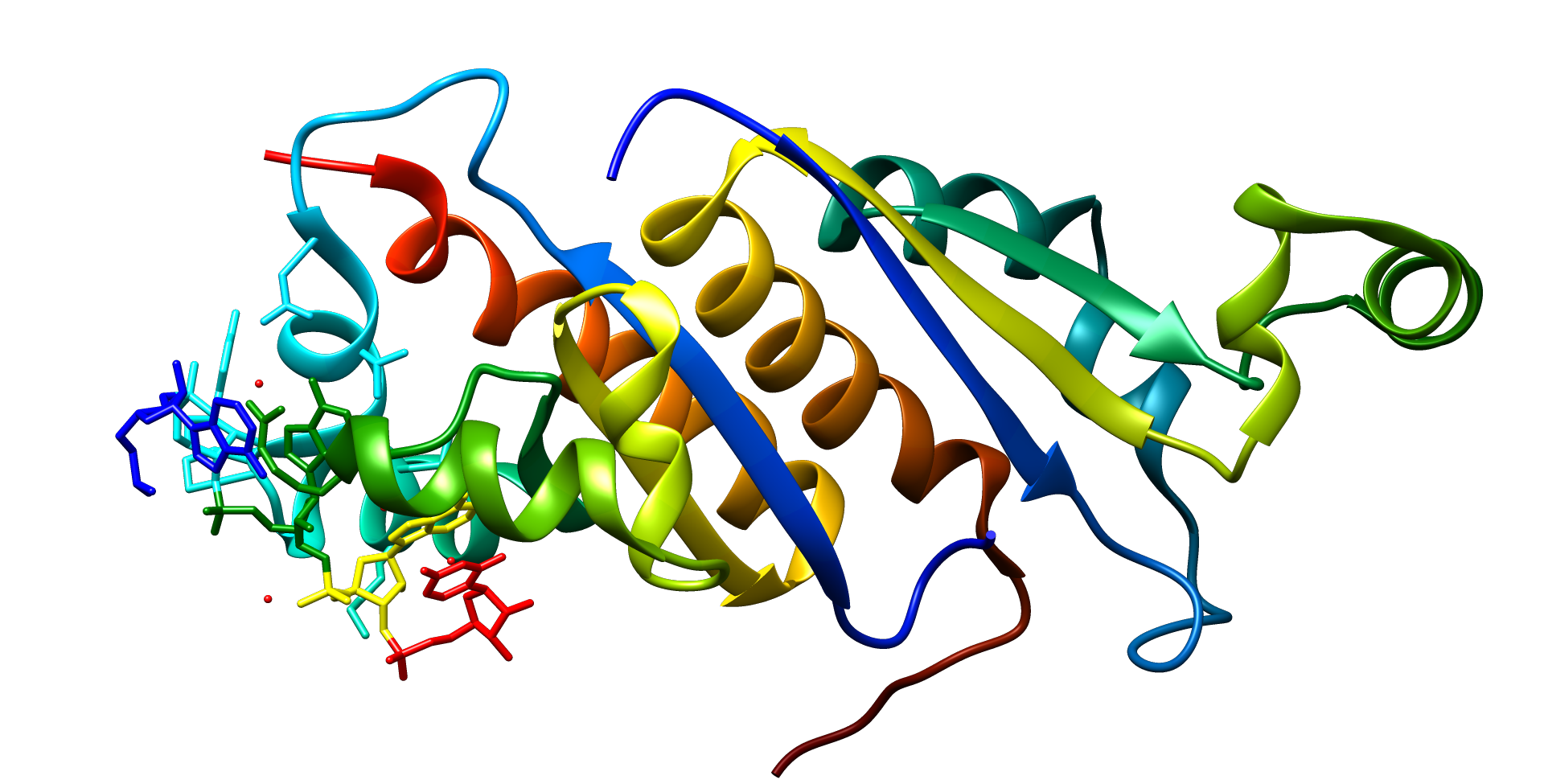

Identifiers
- Aliases: KHDRBS3, Etle, SALP, SLM-2, SLM2, T-STAR, TSTAR, etoile, KH domain containing, RNA binding, signal transduction associated 3, KH RNA binding domain containing, signal transduction associated 3
- External IDs: OMIM: 610421; MGI: 1313312; GeneCards: KHDRBS3
Available structures
| PDB | Ortholog search: PDBe RCSB |
| PDB | List of PDB id codes 5ELR, 5ELS, 5EMO, 5ELT, 5EL3 |

Gene location (Mouse)
| Chr. | Chromosome 15 (mouse) |
| Band | 15 D3|15 30.36 cM | Start | 68,800,269 bp |
| Band | 15 D3|15 30.36 cM | End | 68,973,060 bp |
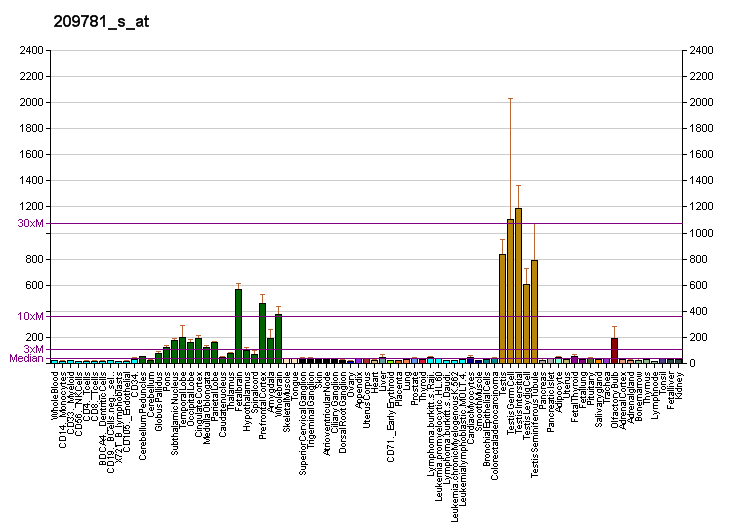
RNA expression pattern
| Bgee | Human / Mouse (ortholog); Top expressed in: middle temporal gyrus; prefrontal cortex; Brodmann area 9; secondary oocyte; Brodmann area 23; sperm; Brodmann area 46; cingulate gyrus; orbitofrontal cortex; amygdala / Top expressed in: interventricular septum; neural layer of retina; dentate gyrus of hippocampal formation granule cell; visual cortex; primary visual cortex; superior frontal gyrus; hippocampus proper; ventricular zone; prefrontal cortex; primary motor cortex; More reference expression data |
| BioGPS | More reference expression data |
Gene ontology
| Molecular function | SH3 domain binding; protein binding; RNA binding; nucleic acid binding; protein domain specific binding; identical protein binding |
| Cellular component | nucleus; nucleoplasm |
| Biological process | regulation of transcription, DNA-templated; transcription, DNA-templated; mRNA processing; regulation of mRNA splicing, via spliceosome; protein complex oligomerization |
Sources:Amigo / QuickGO
Orthologs
| Databases | NCBI: entry |
| Species | Human | Mouse |
| Entrez | 10656 | 13992 |
| Ensembl | n/a | ENSMUSG00000022332 |
| UniProt | O75525 | Q9R226 |
| RefSeq (mRNA) | NM_006558 | NM_010158 |
| RefSeq (protein) | NP_006549 | NP_034288 |
| Location (UCSC) | n/a | Chr 15: 68.8 – 68.97 Mb |
| PubMed search |
- Wikidata
| View/Edit Human | View/Edit Mouse |

KH domain-containing, RNA-binding, signal transduction-associated protein 3 is a protein that in humans is encoded by the KHDRBS3 gene.

== Function ==
KHDRBS3 regulates the alternative mRNA splicing of the sacromere protein titin (TTN), leading to intron retention. Overexpression of KHDRBS3 in induced pluripotent stem cell-derived cardiomyocytes (iPSC-CMs) increased Ca^{2+} transient amplitude and resulted in an increase of F_{max}.

== Clinical significance ==
KHDRBS3 (T-STAR) expression has been shown to be increased in prostate cancer tissue compared to the surrounding benign tissue. Expression of KHDRBS3 correlates with mpMRI signal measured through Likert score a system similar to PI-RADS. While still under debate, mpMRI signal correlates with higher Gleason grade and tumour size, in addition to histopathological features associated with clinically aggressive prostate cancer. Expression of KHDRBS3 was increased in the failing human myocardium of heart failure patients, here KHDRBS3 protein interacted with several important mRNAs coding for sarcomere components, such as actin gamma 1 (ACTG1), myosin light chain 2 (MYL2), ryanodine receptor 2 (RYR2), troponin I3 (TNNI3), troponin T2 (TNNT2), tropomyosin 1 (TPM1), tropomyosin 2 (TPM2), and titin (TTN).

In prostate cancer cell lines KHDRBS3 appears to be androgen regulated, with a reduction in mRNA expression occurring following addition of synthetic androgen R1881 to cells.

== Interactions ==
KHDRBS3 has been shown to interact with SIAH1.

KHDRBS3 interacts with splicing protein Sam68 and oncogene metadherin in prostate cancer cells.
