= RNA recognition motif =

RNA recognition motif. (a.k.a. RRM, RBD, or RNP domain)

Identifiers
- Symbol: RRM_1
- Pfam: PF00076
- Pfam clan: CL0221
- ECOD: 304.9.1
- InterPro: IPR000504
- PROSITE: PDOC00030
- SCOP2: 1sxl / SCOPe / SUPFAM
Available protein structures:
- PDB: 1cvjF:101-170 1x5tA:102-174 2cpzA:403-474 1u6fA:45-116 1fxlA:48-119 1g2eA:48-119 1d8zA:41-112 1fnxH:41-112 3sxlA:127-198 1b7fB:127-198 2sxl :127-198 1x4eA:58-117 1x5sA:8-79 2cqcA:120-191 2cqdA:13-68 2cqbA:8-79 2cq3A:123-192 2errA:119-188 2cpjA:152-153 2cqiA:11-80 1x5uA:15-86 2cq0A:241-312 1d9aA:127-198 1sxl :213-279 1x5oA:143-207 1x5pA:264-327 1x4gA:207-272 1x4aA:18-86 1wf2A:18-82 1wf1A:23-87 2f9jB:21-89 2f9dB:21-89 1p1tA:18-89 2u2fA:261-332 1p27B:75-146 1hl6C:75-146 1rk8A:75-146 1oo0B:75-146 2cq4A:168-238 1rkjA:396-462 1fjcA:396-462 1fjeB:396-462 1wi8A:98-168 2cqhA:5-71 2mssA:111-181 2mstA:111-181 1uawA:22-92 1hd0A:99-169 1hd1A:99-169 2up1A:16-86 1u1kA:16-86 1pgzA:16-86 1u1pA:16-86 1u1oA:16-86 1up1 :16-86 1u1rA:16-86 1po6A:16-86 1u1lA:16-86 1u1qA:16-86 1u1nA:16-86 1ha1 :16-86 1u1mA:16-86 1l3kA:16-86 1x4bA:23-93 1wtbA:184-254 1iqtA:184-254 1x0fA:184-254 2cqgA:106-175 1wf0A:193-236 2cpfA:724-798 2cphA:826-899 1x4hA:327-404 1h6kY:42-113 1n52B:42-113 1h2tZ:42-113 1h2vZ:42-113 1n54B:42-113 1h2uX:42-113 1no8A:107-177 2cpxA:311-382 1dz5A:12-84 1m5kC:12-84 1m5pF:12-84 1m5vF:12-84 1cx0A:12-84 1audA:12-84 1vc0A:12-84 1m5oC:12-84 1vc5A:12-84 1vbzA:12-84 1vbxA:12-84 1nu4B:12-84 1sjfA:12-84 1fht :12-84 3utrD:12-84 1u6bA:12-84 1zznA:12-84 1vc6A:12-84 1sj4P:12-84 1drzA:12-84 1sj3P:12-84 1vbyA:12-84 1oiaB:12-84 1vc7A:12-84 1a9nD:24-81 1x4cA:123-187 1wg4A:114-178 1u2fA:151-226 2cpeA:363-442 1wg1A:71-135 1bnyA:26-87 2u1a :210-277 2cpiA:130-188 1jmtA:91-142 1opiA:400-461 1o0pA:400-461 1qm9A:456-524 2adcA:456-524 2evzA:456-524 2adbA:186-253 1sjrA:186-253 1fj7A:310-379 1wexA:127-177 1zh5A:113-182 1ytyA:113-182 1s79A:113-182 1wg5A:113-183 1wezA:291-359 1welA:432-502 2cqpA:928-999 2cpyA:546-616 IPR000504 PF00076 (ECOD; PDBsum)
- AlphaFold: IPR000504; PF00076

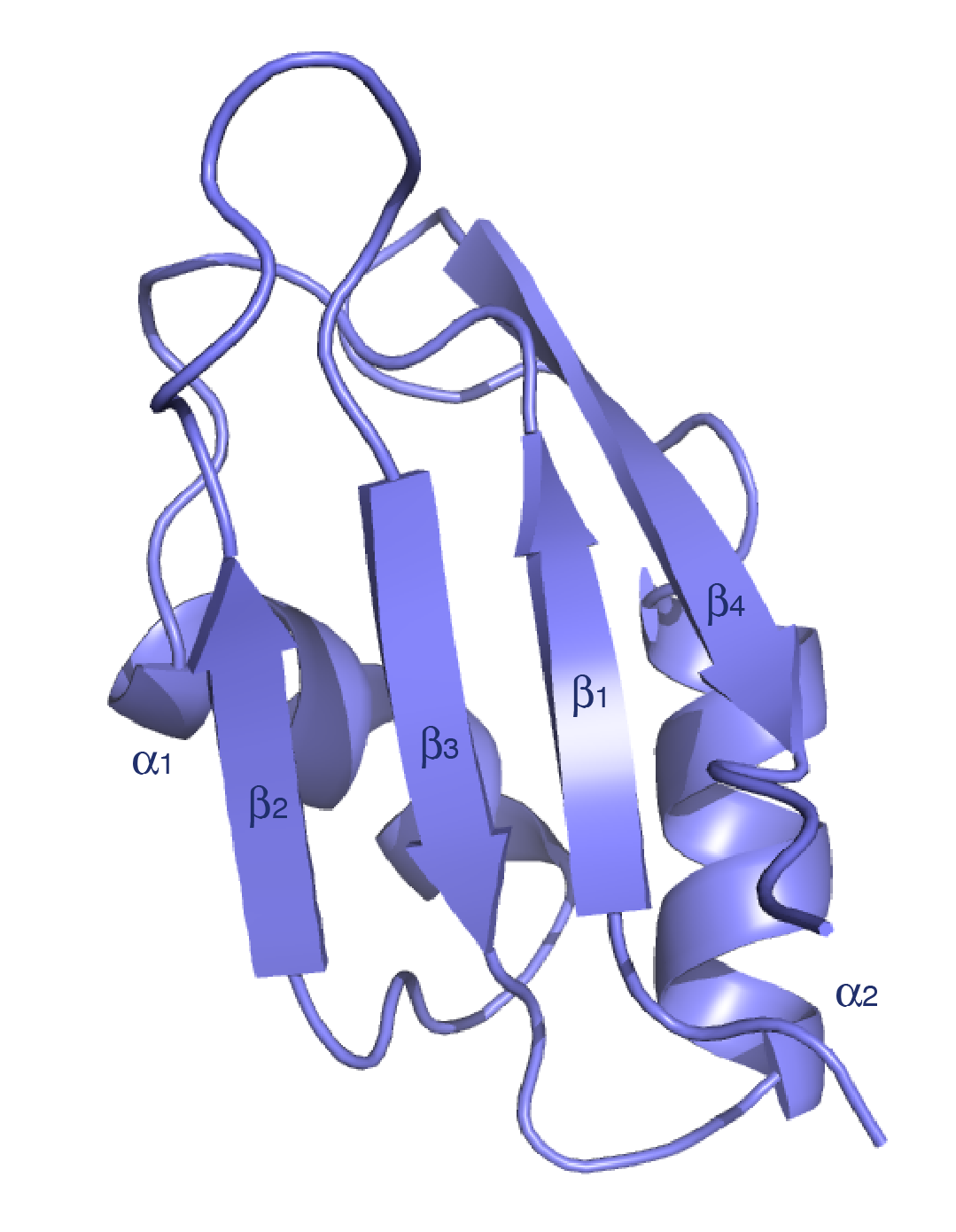
Typical architecture of an RRM domain, with a four-stranded antiparallel beta-sheet, stacked on two alpha helices

RNA recognition motif, RNP-1 is a putative RNA-binding domain of about 90 amino acids that are known to bind single-stranded RNAs. It was found in many eukaryotic proteins.

The largest group of single strand RNA-binding protein is the eukaryotic RNA recognition motif (RRM) family that contains an eight amino acid RNP-1 consensus sequence.

RRM proteins have a variety of RNA binding preferences and functions, and include heterogeneous nuclear ribonucleoproteins (hnRNPs), proteins implicated in regulation of alternative splicing (SR, U2AF2, Sxl), protein components of small nuclear ribonucleoproteins (U1 and U2 snRNPs), and proteins that regulate RNA stability and translation (PABP, La, Hu). The RRM in heterodimeric splicing factor U2 snRNP auxiliary factor appears to have two RRM-like domains with specialised features for protein recognition. The motif also appears in a few single stranded DNA binding proteins.

The typical RRM consists of four anti-parallel beta-strands and two alpha-helices arranged in a beta-alpha-beta-beta-alpha-beta fold with side chains that stack with RNA bases. A third helix is present during RNA binding in some cases. The RRM is reviewed in a number of publications.

== Human proteins containing this domain ==
A2BP1; ACF; BOLL; BRUNOL4; BRUNOL5; BRUNOL6; CCBL2; CGI-96; CIRBP; CNOT4; CPEB2; CPEB3; CPEB4; CPSF7; CSTF2; CSTF2T; CUGBP1; CUGBP2; D10S102; DAZ1; DAZ2; DAZ3; DAZ4; DAZAP1; DAZL; DNAJC17; DND1; EIF3S4; EIF3S9; EIF4B; EIF4H; ELAVL1; ELAVL2; ELAVL3; ELAVL4; ENOX1; ENOX2; EWSR1; FUS; G3BP; G3BP1; G3BP2; GRSF1; HNRNPL; HNRPA0; HNRPA1; HNRPA2B1; HNRPA3; HNRPAB; HNRPC; HNRPCL1; HNRPD; HNRPDL; HNRPF; HNRPH1; HNRPH2; HNRPH3; HNRPL; HNRPLL; HNRPM; HNRPR; HRNBP1; HSU53209; HTATSF1; IGF2BP1; IGF2BP2; IGF2BP3; LARP7; MKI67IP; MSI1; MSI2; MSSP-2; MTHFSD; MYEF2; NCBP2; NCL; NOL8; NONO; P14; PABPC1; PABPC1L; PABPC3; PABPC4; PABPC5; PABPN1; POLDIP3; PPARGC1; PPARGC1A; PPARGC1B; PPIE; PPIL4; PPRC1; PSPC1; PTBP1; PTBP2; PUF60; RALY; RALYL; RAVER1; RAVER2; RBM10; RBM11; RBM12; RBM12B; RBM14; RBM15; RBM15B; RBM16; RBM17; RBM18; RBM19; RBM22; RBM23; RBM24; RBM25; RBM26; RBM27; RBM28; RBM3; RBM32B; RBM33; RBM34; RBM35A; RBM35B; RBM38; RBM39; RBM4; RBM41; RBM42; RBM44; RBM45; RBM46; RBM47; RBM4B; RBM5; RBM7; RBM8A; RBM9; RBMS1; RBMS2; RBMS3; RBMX; RBMX2; RBMXL2; RBMY1A1; RBMY1B; RBMY1E; RBMY1F; RBMY2FP; RBPMS; RBPMS2; RDBP; RNPC3; RNPC4; RNPS1; ROD1; SAFB; SAFB2; SART3; SETD1A; SF3B6; SF3B4; SFPQ; SFRS1; SFRS10; SFRS11; SFRS12; SFRS15; SRSF2; SFRS2B; SFRS3; SFRS4; SFRS5; SFRS6; SFRS7; SFRS9; SLIRP; SLTM; SNRP70; SNRPA; SNRPB2; SPEN; SR140; SRRP35; SSB; SYNCRIP; TAF15; TARDBP; THOC4; TIA1; TIAL1; TNRC4; TNRC6C; TRA2A; TRSPAP1; TUT1; U1SNRNPBP; U2AF1; U2AF2; UHMK1; ZCRB1; ZNF638; ZRSR1; ZRSR2;
