= CELF =

CELF may refer to:

- CE Linux Forum, Consumer Electronics Linux Forum
- Clinical Evaluation of Language Fundamentals, see Linguistic performance#Performance measures
- CELF, a group of proteins
- ‘Art’ in the Welsh language

See also:

- CELF1, a gene
- CELF2, a gene
- CUGBP Elav-like family member 4, protein encoded by CELF4
