= TIAL1 =

Protein-coding gene in the species Homo sapiens

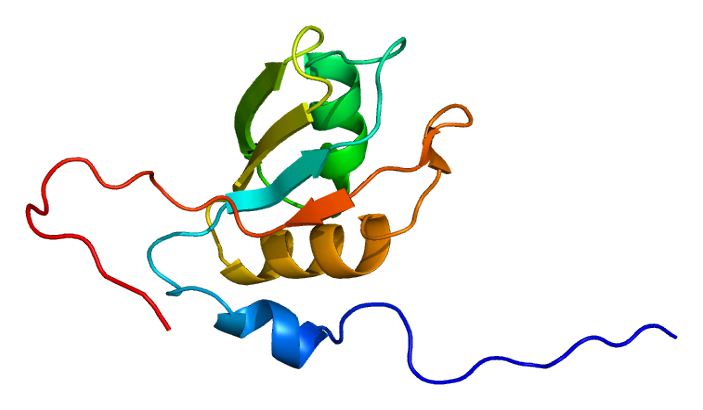

Identifiers
- Aliases: TIAL1, TCBP, TIAR, TIA1 cytotoxic granule-associated RNA binding protein-like 1, TIA1 cytotoxic granule associated RNA binding protein like 1
- External IDs: OMIM: 603413; MGI: 107913; GeneCards: TIAL1
Available structures
PDB	Ortholog search: PDBe RCSB
PDB	List of PDB id codes 1X4G, 2CQI, 2DH7

Gene location (Human)
Chr.	Chromosome 10 (human)
Band	10q26.11	Start	119,571,802 bp
Band	10q26.11	End	119,597,029 bp

Gene location (Mouse)
Chr.	Chromosome 7 (mouse)
Band	7|7 F3	Start	128,439,777 bp
Band	7|7 F3	End	128,461,717 bp
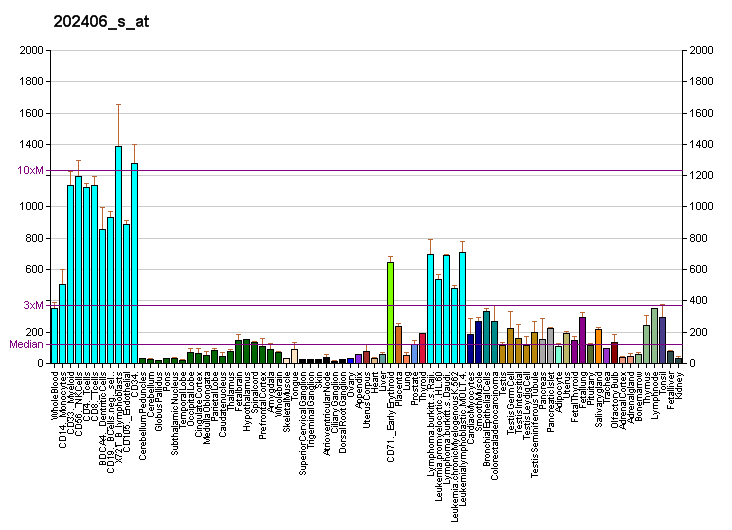

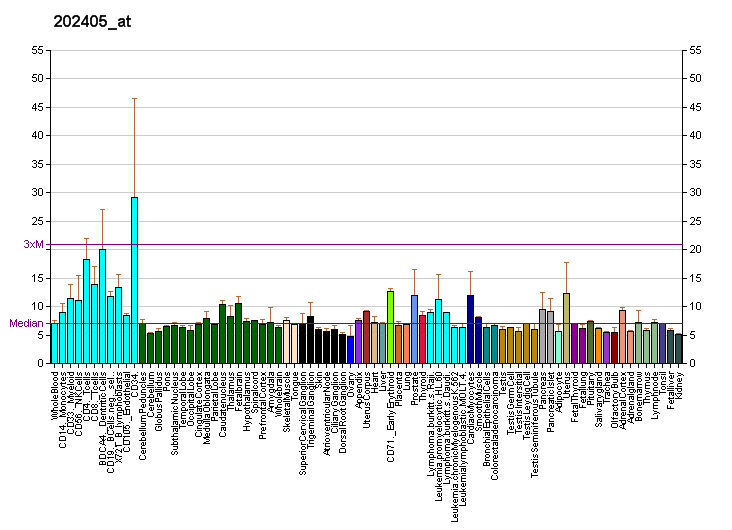
RNA expression pattern
Bgee	Human / Mouse (ortholog); Top expressed in: right uterine tube; body of uterus; left ovary; left lobe of thyroid gland; muscle layer of sigmoid colon; canal of the cervix; tibia; right ovary; minor salivary glands; skin of abdomen / Top expressed in: neural layer of retina; cerebellar cortex; ventricular zone; epiblast; medullary collecting duct; Paneth cell; spermatocyte; paraventricular nucleus of hypothalamus; arcuate nucleus; superior frontal gyrus; More reference expression data
BioGPS	More reference expression data
Gene ontology
Molecular function	nucleic acid binding; RNA binding; DNA binding; mRNA 3'-UTR AU-rich region binding
Cellular component	cytoplasm; cytoplasmic stress granule; lysosome; extracellular exosome; nucleus; nucleoplasm; ribonucleoprotein complex
Biological process	regulation of transcription by RNA polymerase II; germ cell development; defense response; stem cell division; positive regulation of cell population proliferation; apoptotic process; fibroblast growth factor receptor signaling pathway
Sources:Amigo / QuickGO
Orthologs
Databases	NCBI: entry; OMA: entry
Species	Human	Mouse
Entrez	7073	21843
Ensembl	ENSG00000151923	ENSMUSG00000030846
UniProt	Q01085	P70318
RefSeq (mRNA)	NM_001033925; NM_003252; NM_001323964; NM_001323965; NM_001323967 NM_001323968; NM_001323969; NM_001323970; NM_022333	NM_009383; NM_001347640; NM_001347641
RefSeq (protein)	NP_001029097; NP_001310893; NP_001310894; NP_001310896; NP_001310897 NP_001310898; NP_001310899; NP_003243	NP_001334569; NP_001334570; NP_033409
Location (UCSC)	Chr 10: 119.57 – 119.6 Mb	Chr 7: 128.44 – 128.46 Mb
PubMed search
- Wikidata
View/Edit Human	View/Edit Mouse

Nucleolysin TIAR is a protein that in humans is encoded by the TIAL1 gene.

The protein encoded by this gene is a member of a family of RNA-binding proteins, has three RNA recognition motifs (RRMs), and binds adenine and uridine-rich elements in mRNA and pre-mRNAs of a wide range of genes. It regulates various activities including translational control, splicing and apoptosis. Alternate transcriptional splice variants, encoding different isoforms, have been characterized. The different isoforms have been shown to function differently with respect to post-transcriptional silencing.
