= IGF2BP2 =

Protein-coding gene in the species Homo sapiens

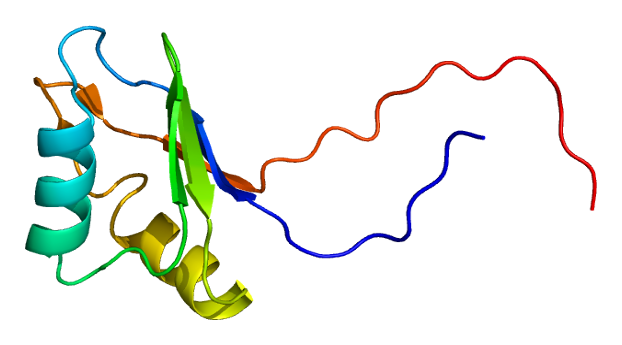

Identifiers
- Aliases: IGF2BP2, IMP-2, IMP2, VICKZ2, insulin like growth factor 2 mRNA binding protein 2
- External IDs: OMIM: 608289; MGI: 1890358; GeneCards: IGF2BP2
Available structures
PDB	Ortholog search: PDBe RCSB
PDB	List of PDB id codes 2CQH

Gene location (Human)
Chr.	Chromosome 3 (human)
Band	3q27.2	Start	185,643,130 bp
Band	3q27.2	End	185,825,042 bp

Gene location (Mouse)
Chr.	Chromosome 16 (mouse)
Band	16|16 B1	Start	21,877,759 bp
Band	16|16 B1	End	21,982,049 bp
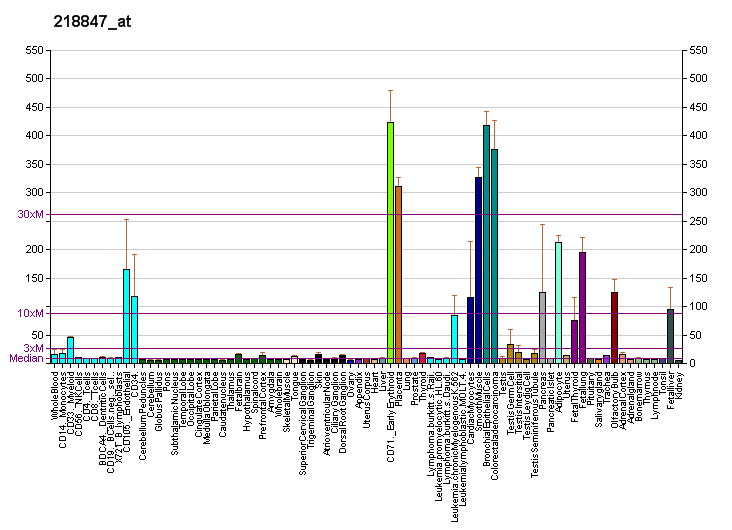
RNA expression pattern
Bgee	Human / Mouse (ortholog); Top expressed in: buccal mucosa cell; ventricular zone; sural nerve; stromal cell of endometrium; embryo; ganglionic eminence; amniotic fluid; bronchial epithelial cell; mucosa of paranasal sinus; cartilage tissue / Top expressed in: primitive streak; medullary collecting duct; primary oocyte; Paneth cell; fossa; renal corpuscle; condyle; tail of embryo; genital tubercle; abdominal wall; More reference expression data
BioGPS	More reference expression data
Gene ontology
Molecular function	mRNA 5'-UTR binding; protein binding; mRNA binding; translation regulator activity; mRNA 3'-UTR binding; nucleic acid binding; RNA binding
Cellular component	cytoplasm; cytoskeleton; nucleus; cytosol
Biological process	anatomical structure morphogenesis; negative regulation of translation; mRNA transport; regulation of translation; regulation of mRNA stability; transport
Sources:Amigo / QuickGO
Orthologs
Databases	NCBI: entry; OMA: entry
Species	Human	Mouse
Entrez	10644	319765
Ensembl	ENSG00000073792	ENSMUSG00000033581
UniProt	Q9Y6M1	Q5SF07
RefSeq (mRNA)	NM_001007225; NM_001291869; NM_001291872; NM_001291873; NM_001291874 NM_001291875; NM_006548	NM_183029
RefSeq (protein)	NP_001007226; NP_001278798; NP_001278801; NP_001278802; NP_001278803 NP_001278804; NP_006539	NP_898850
Location (UCSC)	Chr 3: 185.64 – 185.83 Mb	Chr 16: 21.88 – 21.98 Mb
PubMed search
- Wikidata
View/Edit Human	View/Edit Mouse

Insulin-like growth factor 2 mRNA-binding protein 2 is a protein that in humans is encoded by the IGF2BP2 gene.

This gene encodes a member of the IGF-II mRNA-binding protein (IMP) family. The protein encoded by this gene contains four KH domains and two RRM domains. It functions by binding to the 5' UTR of the insulin-like growth factor 2 (IGF2) mRNA and regulating IGF2 translation. Alternate transcriptional splice variants, encoding different isoforms, have been characterized.

== See also ==
- IGF2BP1
- IGF2BP3
