= IGF2BP1 =

Protein-coding gene in the species Homo sapiens

Identifiers
- Aliases: IGF2BP1, CRD-BP, CRDBP, IMP-1, IMP1, VICKZ1, ZBP1, insulin like growth factor 2 mRNA binding protein 1
- External IDs: OMIM: 608288; MGI: 1890357; GeneCards: IGF2BP1
Available structures
PDB	Ortholog search: PDBe RCSB
PDB	List of PDB id codes 3KRM

Gene location (Human)
Chr.	Chromosome 17 (human)
Band	17q21.32	Start	48,997,385 bp
Band	17q21.32	End	49,056,145 bp

Gene location (Mouse)
Chr.	Chromosome 11 (mouse)
Band	11 D|11 59.08 cM	Start	95,957,163 bp
Band	11 D|11 59.08 cM	End	96,005,940 bp
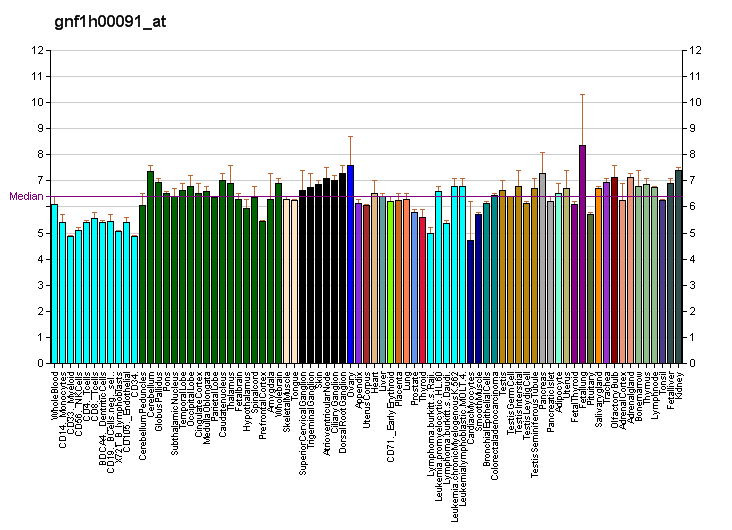
RNA expression pattern
Bgee	Human / Mouse (ortholog); Top expressed in: testicle; ganglionic eminence; gonad; ventricular zone; stromal cell of endometrium; buccal mucosa cell; right testis; left testis; placenta; retinal pigment epithelium / Top expressed in: tail of embryo; abdominal wall; hand; epiblast; mandibular prominence; maxillary prominence; primitive streak; genital tubercle; yolk sac; embryo; More reference expression data
BioGPS	More reference expression data
Gene ontology
Molecular function	translation regulator activity; mRNA 3'-UTR binding; protein binding; nucleic acid binding; mRNA 5'-UTR binding; mRNA binding; RNA binding
Cellular component	cytoplasm; CRD-mediated mRNA stability complex; cell projection; filopodium; growth cone; dendritic spine; axon; dendrite; perinuclear region of cytoplasm; cytoplasmic stress granule; nucleus; lamellipodium; nucleoplasm; cytosol; ribonucleoprotein complex
Biological process	CRD-mediated mRNA stabilization; mRNA transport; negative regulation of translation; pallium cell proliferation in forebrain; neuronal stem cell population maintenance; RNA localization; regulation of translation; regulation of mRNA stability involved in response to stress; regulation of mRNA stability; transport
Sources:Amigo / QuickGO
Orthologs
Databases	NCBI: entry; OMA: entry
Species	Human	Mouse
Entrez	10642	140486
Ensembl	ENSG00000159217	ENSMUSG00000013415
UniProt	Q9NZI8	O88477
RefSeq (mRNA)	NM_001160423; NM_006546	NM_009951
RefSeq (protein)	NP_001153895; NP_006537	NP_034081; NP_001388383; NP_001388384; NP_001388385; NP_001388386
Location (UCSC)	Chr 17: 49 – 49.06 Mb	Chr 11: 95.96 – 96.01 Mb
PubMed search
- Wikidata
View/Edit Human	View/Edit Mouse

Insulin-like growth factor 2 mRNA-binding protein 1 is a protein that in humans is encoded by the IGF2BP1 gene.

This gene encodes a member of the IGF-II mRNA-binding protein (IMP) family. The protein encoded by this gene contains four K homology domains and two RNA recognition motifs. It functions by binding to the 5' UTR of the insulin-like growth factor 2 (IGF2) mRNA and regulating IGF2 translation.

== See also ==
- IGF2BP2
- IGF2BP3
