= MKI67IP =

Protein-coding gene in humans

NIFK
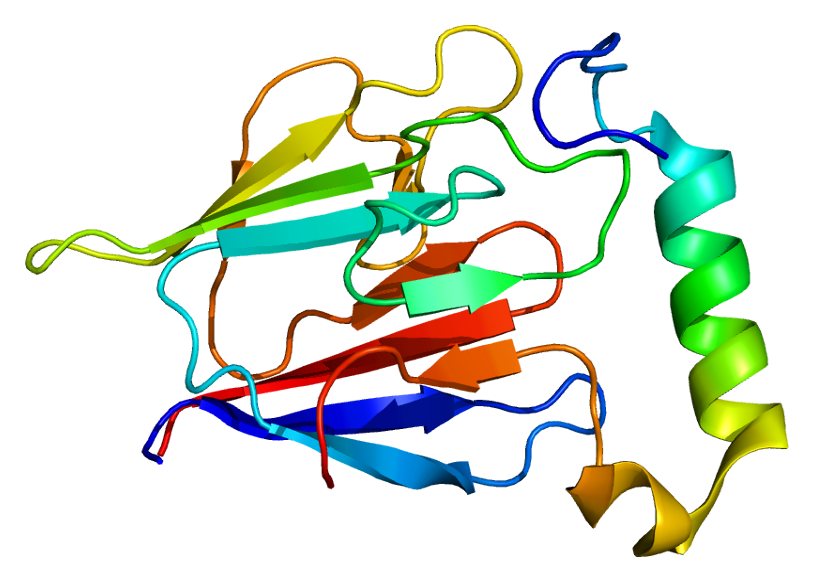

Identifiers
- Aliases: NIFK, MKI67IP, Nopp34, nucleolar protein interacting with the FHA domain of MKI67
- External IDs: OMIM: 611970; MGI: 1915199; GeneCards: NIFK
Available structures
PDB	Ortholog search: PDBe RCSB
PDB	List of PDB id codes 2AFF

Gene location (Human)
Chr.	Chromosome 2 (human)
Band	2q14.3	Start	121,726,945 bp
Band	2q14.3	End	121,736,911 bp

Gene location (Mouse)
Chr.	Chromosome 1 (mouse)
Band	1|1 E2.3	Start	118,249,569 bp
Band	1|1 E2.3	End	118,261,552 bp
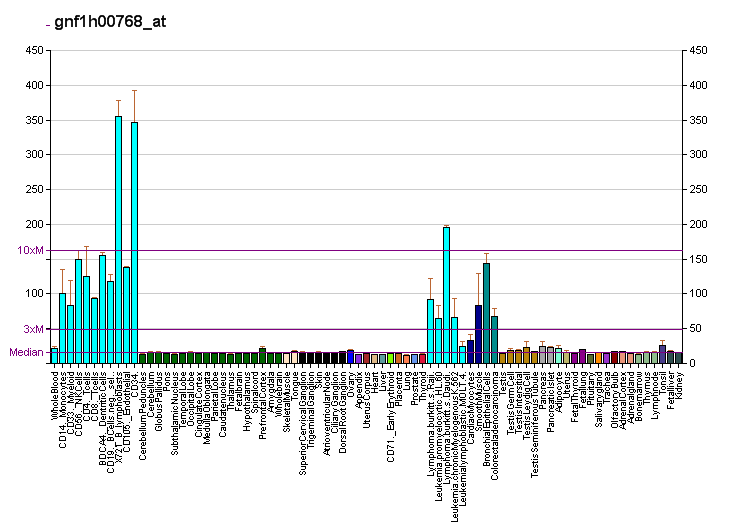
RNA expression pattern
Bgee	Human / Mouse (ortholog); Top expressed in: Achilles tendon; ventricular zone; ganglionic eminence; cartilage tissue; tibialis anterior muscle; mucosa of sigmoid colon; body of pancreas; lymph node; endometrium; appendix / Top expressed in: primitive streak; genital tubercle; epiblast; embryo; embryo; tail of embryo; morula; morula; yolk sac; ventricular zone; More reference expression data
BioGPS	More reference expression data
Gene ontology
Molecular function	protein binding; RNA binding; nucleic acid binding
Cellular component	cytoplasm; condensed nuclear chromosome; chromosome; nucleolus; nucleus; nucleoplasm
Biological process	negative regulation of phosphatase activity; rRNA transcription; rRNA metabolic process; protein-containing complex assembly
Sources:Amigo / QuickGO
Orthologs
Databases	NCBI: entry; OMA: entry
Species	Human	Mouse
Entrez	84365	67949
Ensembl	ENSG00000155438	ENSMUSG00000026377
UniProt	Q9BYG3	Q91VE6
RefSeq (mRNA)	NM_032390	NM_026472
RefSeq (protein)	NP_115766	NP_080748
Location (UCSC)	Chr 2: 121.73 – 121.74 Mb	Chr 1: 118.25 – 118.26 Mb
PubMed search
- Wikidata
View/Edit Human	View/Edit Mouse

FHA Ki67 binding domain of hNIFK
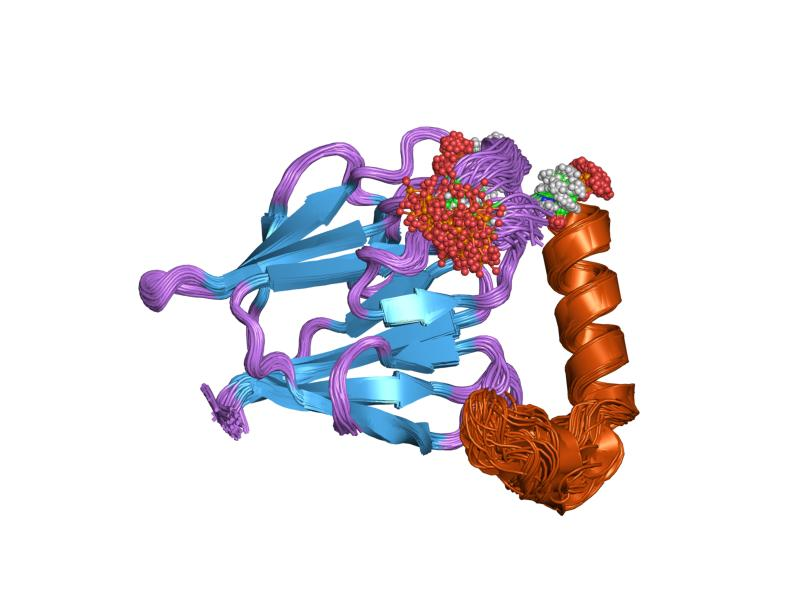
- the solution structure of the ki67fha/hnifk(226-269)3p complex

Identifiers
- Symbol: hNIFK_binding
- Pfam: PF12196
- InterPro: IPR021043
Available protein structures:
- PDB: IPR021043 PF12196 (ECOD; PDBsum)
- AlphaFold: IPR021043; PF12196

MKI67 FHA domain-interacting nucleolar phosphoprotein is a protein that in humans is encoded by the NIFK gene (previously MKI67IP).

MKI67 FHA domain-interacting nucleolar phosphoprotein contains an RNA recognition motif (RRM) near to the N-terminus and a FHA Ki67 binding domain near to the C-terminus. There are two conserved sequence motifs within the FHA Ki67 binding domain: TPVCTP and LERRKS, this domain binds to the forkhead-associated domain of human Ki67. High-affinity binding requires sequential phosphorylation by two kinases, CDK1 and GSK3, yielding pThr238, pThr234 and pSer230. This interaction is involved in cell cycle regulation.
