= RBM34 =

Protein-coding gene in humans

Identifiers
- Aliases: RBM34, RNA binding motif protein 34
- External IDs: MGI: 1098653; GeneCards: RBM34

Gene location (Human)
Chr.	Chromosome 1 (human)
Band	1q42.3	Start	235,131,183 bp
Band	1q42.3	End	235,161,283 bp

Gene location (Mouse)
Chr.	Chromosome 8 (mouse)
Band	8 E2|8 74.64 cM	Start	127,673,922 bp
Band	8 E2|8 74.64 cM	End	127,697,821 bp
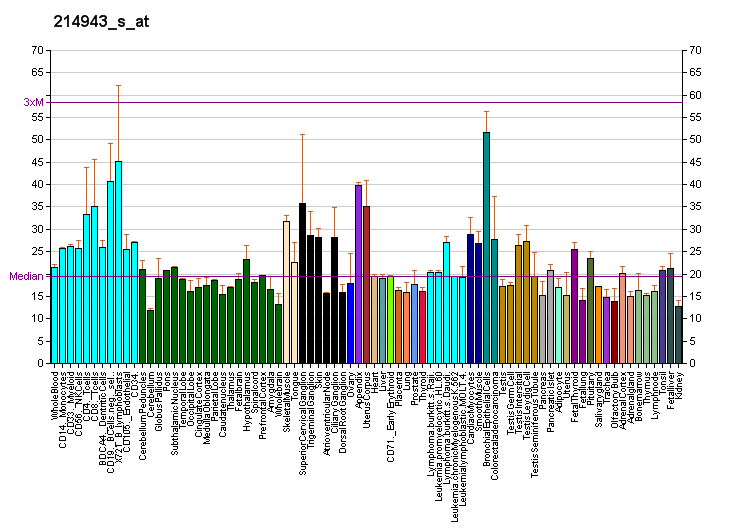

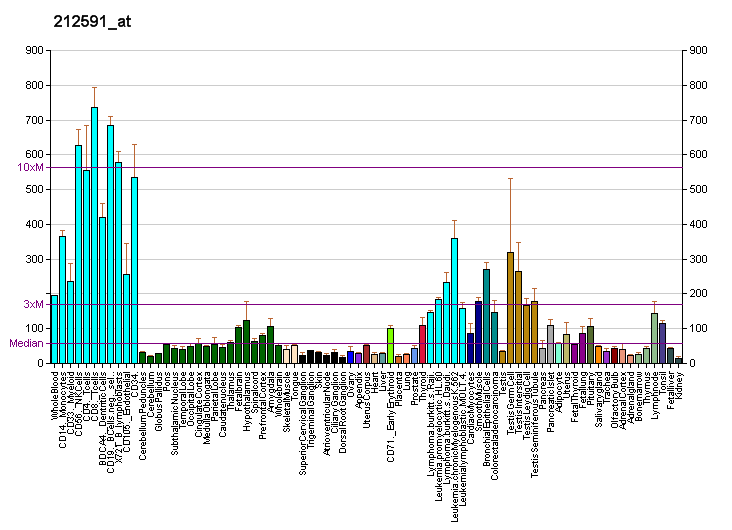
RNA expression pattern
Bgee	Human / Mouse (ortholog); Top expressed in: Achilles tendon; ganglionic eminence; right testis; left testis; olfactory zone of nasal mucosa; C1 segment; monocyte; granulocyte; testicle; skin of abdomen / Top expressed in: otic vesicle; hand; yolk sac; substantia nigra; superior cervical ganglion; Rostral migratory stream; epiblast; primitive streak; otolith organ; utricle; More reference expression data
BioGPS	More reference expression data
Orthologs
Databases	NCBI: entry; OMA: entry
Species	Human	Mouse
Entrez	23029	52202
Ensembl	ENSG00000188739	ENSMUSG00000033931
UniProt	P42696	Q8C5L7
RefSeq (mRNA)	NM_001161533; NM_015014; NM_001346738	NM_172762; NM_001374800
RefSeq (protein)	NP_001333667; NP_055829	NP_766350; NP_001361729
Location (UCSC)	Chr 1: 235.13 – 235.16 Mb	Chr 8: 127.67 – 127.7 Mb
PubMed search
- Wikidata
View/Edit Human	View/Edit Mouse

RNA-binding protein 34 is a protein that in humans is encoded by the RBM34 gene.
