= Ecto-NOX disulfide-thiol exchanger 2 =

Protein-coding gene in humans

ENOX2

Identifiers
- Aliases: ENOX2, APK1, COVA1, tNOX, ecto-NOX disulfide-thiol exchanger 2
- External IDs: OMIM: 300282; MGI: 2384799; GeneCards: ENOX2

Gene location (Human)
Chr.	X chromosome (human)
Band	Xq26.1	Start	130,622,325 bp
Band	Xq26.1	End	130,903,234 bp

Gene location (Mouse)
Chr.	X chromosome (mouse)
Band	X|X A5	Start	48,098,584 bp
Band	X|X A5	End	48,377,136 bp
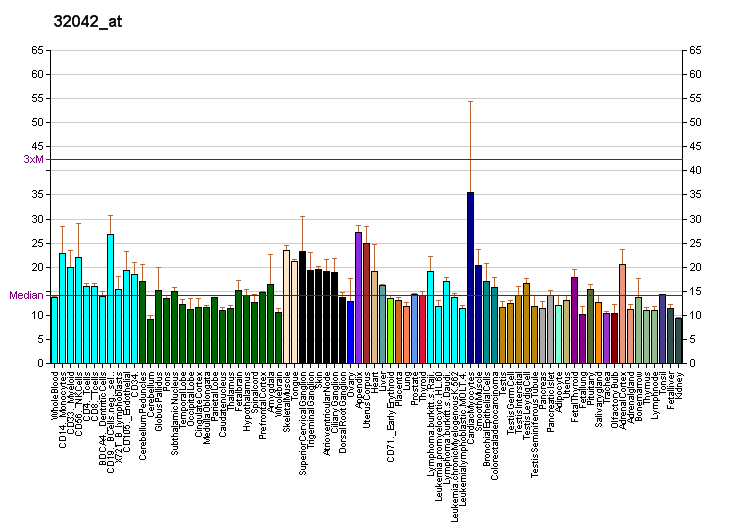

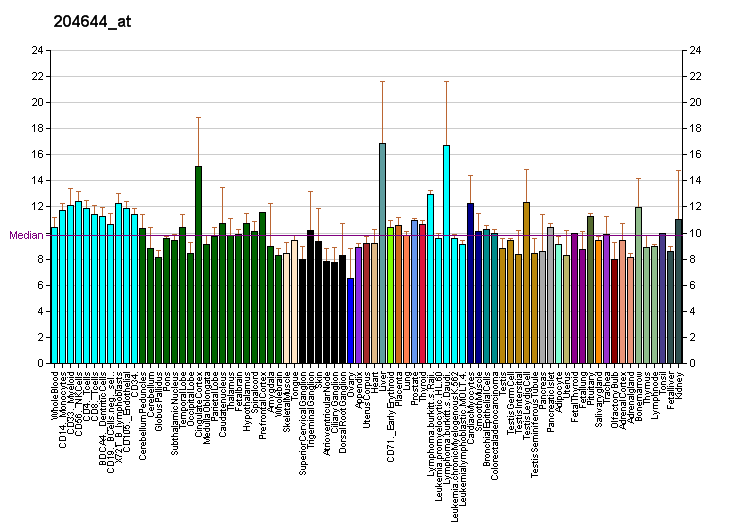

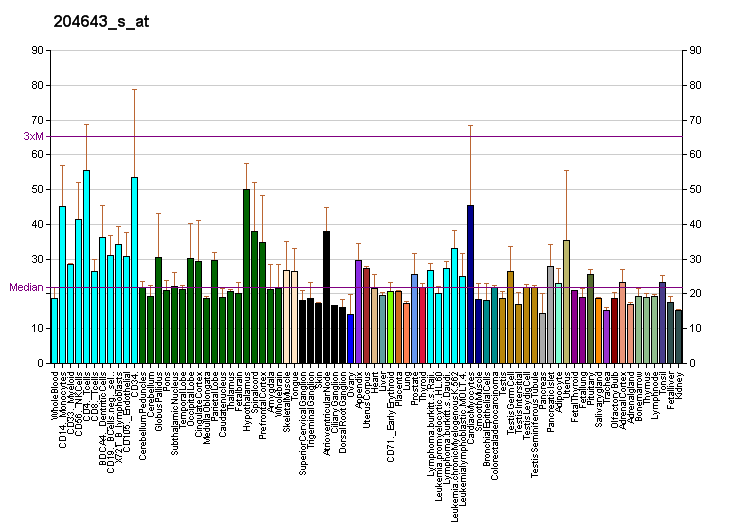
RNA expression pattern
Bgee	Human / Mouse (ortholog); Top expressed in: Achilles tendon; gonad; tendon of biceps brachii; popliteal artery; tibial arteries; right coronary artery; left coronary artery; testicle; thoracic aorta; monocyte / Top expressed in: habenula; interventricular septum; Paneth cell; otic vesicle; muscle of thigh; trigeminal ganglion; sciatic nerve; saccule; substantia nigra; ventricular zone; More reference expression data
BioGPS	More reference expression data
Gene ontology
Molecular function	protein-disulfide reductase activity; oxidoreductase activity; protein binding; nucleic acid binding; RNA binding
Cellular component	extracellular region; cytosol; plasma membrane; membrane; external side of plasma membrane; extracellular space
Biological process	cell growth; regulation of growth; ultradian rhythm; rhythmic process
Sources:Amigo / QuickGO
Orthologs
Databases	NCBI: entry; OMA: entry
Species	Human	Mouse
Entrez	10495	209224
Ensembl	ENSG00000165675	ENSMUSG00000031109
UniProt	Q16206	Q8R0Z2
RefSeq (mRNA)	NM_001281736; NM_006375; NM_182314; NM_001382516; NM_001382517 NM_001382518; NM_001382519; NM_001382520; NM_001382521; NM_001382522	NM_001271447; NM_001271448; NM_001271449; NM_001271450; NM_001271451 NM_145951
RefSeq (protein)	NP_001268665; NP_006366; NP_872114; NP_001369445; NP_001369446 NP_001369447; NP_001369448; NP_001369449; NP_001369450; NP_001369451	NP_001258376; NP_001258377; NP_001258378; NP_001258379; NP_001258380 NP_666063
Location (UCSC)	Chr X: 130.62 – 130.9 Mb	Chr X: 48.1 – 48.38 Mb
PubMed search
- Wikidata
View/Edit Human	View/Edit Mouse

Ecto-NOX disulfide-thiol exchanger 2 is a protein that in humans is encoded by the ENOX2 gene, located on the long arm of the X chromosome. It is a member of the NOX family of NADPH oxidases.

Ecto-NOX disulfide-thiol exchanger 2 is a growth-related cell surface protein. It was identified because it reacts with the monoclonal antibody K1 in cells, such as the ovarian carcinoma line OVCAR-3, also expressing the CAKI surface glycoprotein. The encoded protein has two enzymatic activities: catalysis of hydroquinone or NADH oxidation, and protein disulfide interchange. The two activities alternate with a period length of about 24 minutes. The encoded protein also displays prion-like properties. Two transcript variants encoding different isoforms have been found for this gene.

== Gene location ==
The human ENOX2 gene is located on the long (q) arm of the X chromosome in humans, at region 2 band 6 sub band 1, from base pair 130,622,330 to 130,903,317 (build GRCh38.p7) (map). The gene is conserved in chimpanzee, Rhesus monkey, dog, mouse, rat, chicken, and zebrafish.

== Function ==
ENOX2 and related NOX proteins exhibit two distinct oscillating functions: the oxidation of NADH to NAD+ and a protein disulfide isomerase-like activity, unprecedented in the biochemical literature. Regarding NADH oxidation, the protein has a specific activity of 10-20μmol/min/mg of protein with a turnover number of 200-500. The oscillations are independent of temperature, with a period of 24 minutes, completing 60 cycles in a 24-hour day. The period of oscillation changes to 22 and 26 minutes in the cancer related (tNOX) and age-related (arNOX) forms respectively. This regular oscillation is attributed to the maintenance of biological clock

=== Interactions ===
NADH activity of ENOX2 has been shown to be stimulated by various hormones and growth factors, including insulin, EGF, transferrin, lactoferrin, vasopressin and glucagon. This stimulation is not seen in protein samples recovered from cancer cells, suggesting the regular NADH oxidase activity of ENOX2 is decoupled in cancer. ENOX2 also has a number of protein-protein interactions, with ENOX1 and SOX2, among others.

=== Cell growth ===
Numerous studies in the 1990s correlated NADH oxidase activity with cell growth. Conditions which stimulated cell growth also stimulated NADH oxidase activity and conditions that inhibited cell growth inhibited NADH oxidase activity. Further experimental evidence showed that the rate of cell enlargement oscillates within the 24 minute oscillation of ENOX function. Maximum cell growth rates correspond to the portion of the ENOX cycle involved in protein dulsulfide bridge formation. Theories suggest that ENOX is responsible for the breakup and formation of disulfide bonds in membrane proteins, thus maximum cell growth coincides with maximum protein disulfide interchange activity.

== Role in disease ==
=== Cancer ===
The cancer associated, drug responsive variant of ENOX, tNOX, arises as a splice variant and is found on the cell surface of human cancers. tNOX exhibits a periodicity of 22 minutes, compared to the native 24 minutes and can be inhibited by a number of anticancer drugs, without affecting the native ENOX. These properties of tNOX are being used to develop early detection and intervention mechanisms for human cancers.

== See also ==
Ecto-NOX disulfide-thiol exchanger 1
