= Ecto-NOX disulfide-thiol exchanger 1 =

Protein-coding gene in the species Homo sapiens

ENOX1

Identifiers
- Aliases: ENOX1, CNOX, PIG38, bA64J21.1, cCNOX, ecto-NOX disulfide-thiol exchanger 1
- External IDs: OMIM: 610914; MGI: 2444896; GeneCards: ENOX1

Gene location (Human)
Chr.	Chromosome 13 (human)
Band	13q14.11	Start	43,213,130 bp
Band	13q14.11	End	43,786,972 bp

Gene location (Mouse)
Chr.	Chromosome 14 (mouse)
Band	14|14 D3	Start	77,156,763 bp
Band	14|14 D3	End	77,721,760 bp
RNA expression pattern
Bgee	Human / Mouse (ortholog); Top expressed in: sperm; ganglionic eminence; secondary oocyte; testicle; middle temporal gyrus; Brodmann area 23; cartilage tissue; ventricular zone; prefrontal cortex; C1 segment / Top expressed in: zygote; primary oocyte; secondary oocyte; ganglionic eminence; trigeminal ganglion; lumbar spinal ganglion; neural layer of retina; medial ganglionic eminence; piriform cortex; Rostral migratory stream; More reference expression data
BioGPS	n/a
Gene ontology
Molecular function	oxidoreductase activity; protein binding; nucleic acid binding
Cellular component	extracellular region; membrane; extracellular space; plasma membrane; external side of plasma membrane
Biological process	rhythmic process; ultradian rhythm
Sources:Amigo / QuickGO
Orthologs
Databases	NCBI: entry; OMA: entry
Species	Human	Mouse
Entrez	55068	239188
Ensembl	ENSG00000120658	ENSMUSG00000022012
UniProt	Q8TC92	Q8BHR2
RefSeq (mRNA)	NM_001127615; NM_001242863; NM_017993; NM_001347963; NM_001347964 NM_001347965; NM_001347966; NM_001347967; NM_001347968; NM_001347969; NM_001347970; NM_001347971	NM_001253759; NM_172813
RefSeq (protein)	NP_001121087; NP_001229792; NP_060463; NP_001334892; NP_001334893 NP_001334894; NP_001334895; NP_001334896; NP_001334897; NP_001334898; NP_001334899; NP_001334900	NP_001240688; NP_766401
Location (UCSC)	Chr 13: 43.21 – 43.79 Mb	Chr 14: 77.16 – 77.72 Mb
PubMed search
- Wikidata
View/Edit Human	View/Edit Mouse

Ecto-NOX disulfide-thiol exchanger 1 is a protein that in humans is encoded by the ENOX1 gene.

== Function ==
Electron transport pathways are generally associated with mitochondrial membranes, but non-mitochondrial pathways are also biologically significant. Plasma membrane electron transport pathways are involved in functions as diverse as cellular defense, intracellular redox homeostasis, and control of cell growth and survival. Members of the ecto-NOX family, such as CNOX, or ENOX1, are involved in plasma membrane transport pathways. These enzymes exhibit both a hydroquinone (NADH) oxidase activity and a protein disulfide-thiol interchange activity in series, with each activity cycling every 22 to 26 minutes (Scarlett et al., 2005 [PubMed 15882838]).

== See also ==
Ecto-NOX disulfide-thiol exchanger 2
