= RBM28 =

Protein-coding gene in the species Homo sapiens

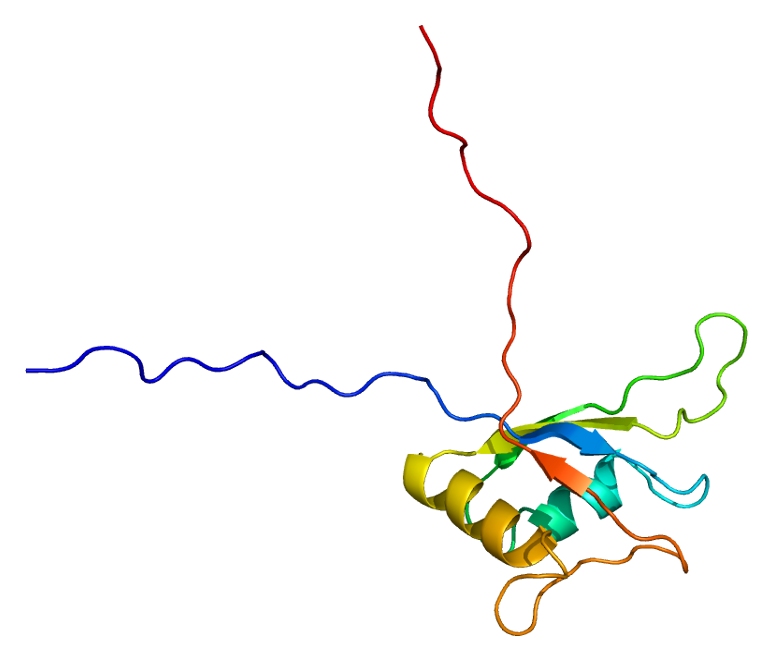

Identifiers
- Aliases: RBM28, ANES, RNA binding motif protein 28
- External IDs: OMIM: 612074; MGI: 2655711; GeneCards: RBM28

Gene location (Human)
Chr.	Chromosome 7 (human)
Band	7q32.1	Start	128,297,685 bp
Band	7q32.1	End	128,343,908 bp

Gene location (Mouse)
Chr.	Chromosome 6 (mouse)
Band	6|6 A3.3	Start	29,123,575 bp
Band	6|6 A3.3	End	29,165,005 bp
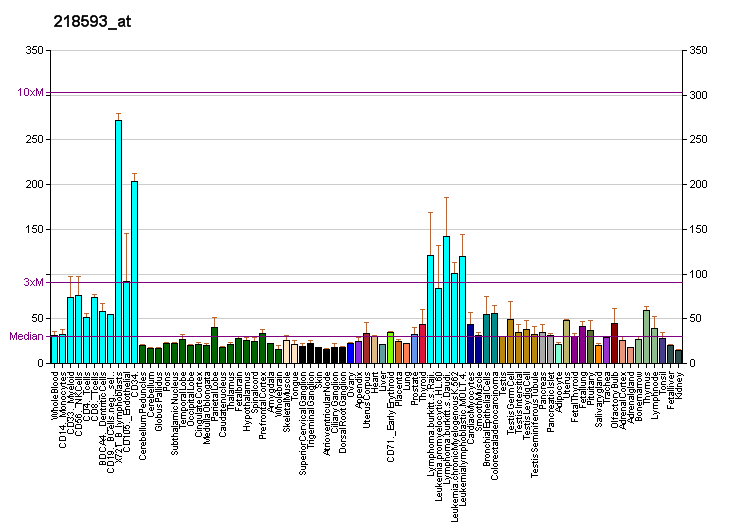
RNA expression pattern
Bgee	Human / Mouse (ortholog); Top expressed in: sural nerve; Achilles tendon; apex of heart; right auricle of heart; gastrocnemius muscle; epithelium of colon; left ventricle; gastric mucosa; corpus callosum; subcutaneous adipose tissue / Top expressed in: tail of embryo; genital tubercle; epiblast; ventricular zone; somite; molar; right ventricle; morula; primary oocyte; zygote; More reference expression data
BioGPS	More reference expression data
Gene ontology
Molecular function	nucleic acid binding; RNA binding
Cellular component	spliceosomal complex; nucleus; nucleolus; ribonucleoprotein complex
Biological process	mRNA processing; RNA splicing
Sources:Amigo / QuickGO
Orthologs
Databases	NCBI: entry; OMA: entry
Species	Human	Mouse
Entrez	55131	68272
Ensembl	ENSG00000106344	ENSMUSG00000029701
UniProt	Q9NW13	Q8CGC6
RefSeq (mRNA)	NM_001166135; NM_018077	NM_026650; NM_133925
RefSeq (protein)	NP_001159607; NP_060547	NP_598686
Location (UCSC)	Chr 7: 128.3 – 128.34 Mb	Chr 6: 29.12 – 29.17 Mb
PubMed search
- Wikidata
View/Edit Human	View/Edit Mouse

RNA-binding protein 28 is a protein that in humans is encoded by the RBM28 gene. It is a nucleolar component of the spliceosomal ribonucleoprotein complexes.
