= RNPS1 =

Protein-coding gene in the species Homo sapiens

Identifiers
- Aliases: RNPS1, E5.1, RNA binding protein with serine rich domain 1
- External IDs: OMIM: 606447; MGI: 97960; GeneCards: RNPS1
Available structures
PDB	Ortholog search: PDBe RCSB
PDB	List of PDB id codes 4A8X

Gene location (Human)
Chr.	Chromosome 16 (human)
Band	16p13.3	Start	2,253,116 bp
Band	16p13.3	End	2,268,397 bp

Gene location (Mouse)
Chr.	Chromosome 17 (mouse)
Band	17|17 A3.3	Start	24,633,539 bp
Band	17|17 A3.3	End	24,644,875 bp
RNA expression pattern
Bgee	Human / Mouse (ortholog); Top expressed in: gonad; cerebellar hemisphere; right hemisphere of cerebellum; right frontal lobe; ganglionic eminence; paraflocculus of cerebellum; anterior cingulate cortex; ventricular zone; gastrocnemius muscle; Brodmann area 10 / Top expressed in: tail of embryo; genital tubercle; ventricular zone; embryo; zygote; yolk sac; embryo; neural layer of retina; morula; lip; More reference expression data
BioGPS	n/a
Gene ontology
Molecular function	mRNA 3'-UTR binding; protein binding; RNA binding; nucleic acid binding
Cellular component	cytoplasm; cytosol; nuclear speck; exon-exon junction complex; nucleoplasm; ASAP complex; nucleus
Biological process	mRNA splicing, via spliceosome; termination of RNA polymerase II transcription; mRNA processing; regulation of alternative mRNA splicing, via spliceosome; mRNA export from nucleus; transcription, DNA-templated; negative regulation of mRNA splicing, via spliceosome; RNA splicing; positive regulation of apoptotic process; nuclear-transcribed mRNA catabolic process, nonsense-mediated decay; mRNA 3'-end processing; RNA export from nucleus
Sources:Amigo / QuickGO
Orthologs
Databases	NCBI: entry; OMA: entry
Species	Human	Mouse
Entrez	10921	19826
Ensembl	ENSG00000205937	ENSMUSG00000034681
UniProt	Q15287	Q99M28
RefSeq (mRNA)	NM_001286625; NM_001286626; NM_001286627; NM_006711; NM_080594	NM_001080127; NM_001080128; NM_009070; NM_001357626
RefSeq (protein)	NP_001273554; NP_001273555; NP_001273556; NP_006702; NP_542161	NP_001073596; NP_001073597; NP_033096; NP_001344555
Location (UCSC)	Chr 16: 2.25 – 2.27 Mb	Chr 17: 24.63 – 24.64 Mb
PubMed search
- Wikidata
View/Edit Human	View/Edit Mouse

RNA-binding protein with serine-rich domain 1 is a protein that in humans is encoded by the RNPS1 gene.

== Function ==
This gene encodes a protein that is part of a post-splicing multiprotein complex, the exon junction complex, involved in both mRNA nuclear export and mRNA surveillance. mRNA surveillance detects exported mRNAs with truncated open reading frames and initiates nonsense-mediated mRNA decay (NMD). When translation ends upstream from the last exon-exon junction, this triggers NMD to degrade mRNAs containing premature stop codons. This protein binds to the mRNA and remains bound after nuclear export, acting as a nucleocytoplasmic shuttling protein. This protein contains many serine residues. Two splice variants have been found for this gene; both variants encode the same protein.

== Interactions ==
RNPS1 has been shown to interact with SART3 and Pinin.
