= SART3 =

Protein-coding gene in the species Homo sapiens

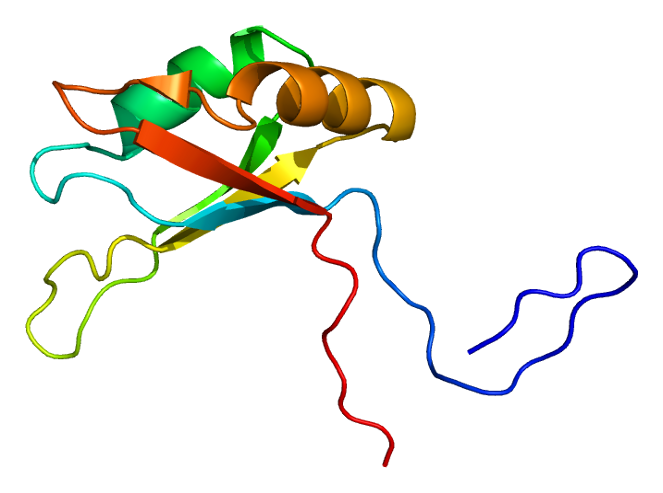

Identifiers
- Aliases: SART3, DSAP1, P100, RP11-13G14, TIP110, p110, p110(nrb), squamous cell carcinoma antigen recognized by T-cells 3, squamous cell carcinoma antigen recognized by T cells 3, spliceosome associated factor 3, U4/U6 recycling protein
- External IDs: OMIM: 611684; MGI: 1858230; GeneCards: SART3
Available structures
PDB	Ortholog search: PDBe RCSB
PDB	List of PDB id codes 2DO4, 5JJW, 5JJX, 5CTT, 5CTR, 5JPZ, 5CTQ

Gene location (Human)
Chr.	Chromosome 12 (human)
Band	12q23.3	Start	108,522,214 bp
Band	12q23.3	End	108,561,400 bp

Gene location (Mouse)
Chr.	Chromosome 5 (mouse)
Band	5|5 F	Start	113,880,507 bp
Band	5|5 F	End	113,910,571 bp
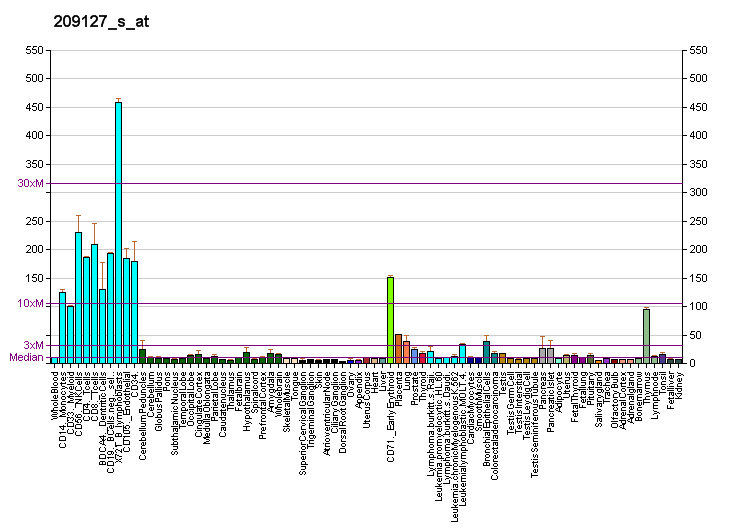

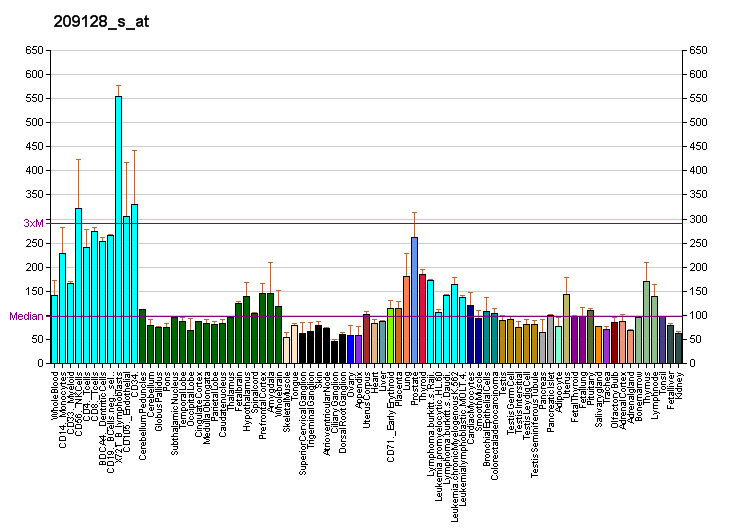
RNA expression pattern
Bgee	Human / Mouse (ortholog); Top expressed in: endothelial cell; secondary oocyte; tendon of biceps brachii; sural nerve; Achilles tendon; nipple; internal globus pallidus; cerebellar hemisphere; cerebellar vermis; epithelium of colon / Top expressed in: tail of embryo; zygote; neural layer of retina; oocyte; primary oocyte; secondary oocyte; genital tubercle; epiblast; ventricular zone; lumbar subsegment of spinal cord; More reference expression data
BioGPS	More reference expression data
Gene ontology
Molecular function	U6atac snRNA binding; histone binding; U4 snRNA binding; protein binding; nucleic acid binding; ubiquitin-specific protease binding; U6 snRNA binding; RNA binding
Cellular component	cytoplasm; Cajal body; nuclear speck; U4/U6 x U5 tri-snRNP complex; nucleoplasm; U4/U6 snRNP; U6atac snRNP; U4atac/U6atac snRNP; nucleus; ASAP complex
Biological process	mRNA splicing, via spliceosome; nucleosome assembly; RNA processing; spliceosomal tri-snRNP complex assembly; homeostasis of number of cells; positive regulation of histone deubiquitination; hematopoietic stem cell proliferation; mRNA processing; spliceosomal snRNP assembly; cell morphogenesis; RNA splicing; regulation of gene expression; regulation of alternative mRNA splicing, via spliceosome
Sources:Amigo / QuickGO
Orthologs
Databases	NCBI: entry; OMA: entry
Species	Human	Mouse
Entrez	9733	53890
Ensembl	ENSG00000075856	ENSMUSG00000018974
UniProt	Q15020	Q9JLI8
RefSeq (mRNA)	NM_014706	NM_016926; NM_001356621; NM_001356623
RefSeq (protein)	NP_055521	NP_058622; NP_001343550; NP_001343552
Location (UCSC)	Chr 12: 108.52 – 108.56 Mb	Chr 5: 113.88 – 113.91 Mb
PubMed search
- Wikidata
View/Edit Human	View/Edit Mouse

Squamous cell carcinoma antigen recognized by T-cells 3 is a protein that in humans is encoded by the SART3 gene.

The protein encoded by this gene is an RNA-binding nuclear protein that is a tumor-rejection antigen. This antigen possesses tumor epitopes capable of inducing HLA-A24-restricted and tumor-specific cytotoxic T lymphocytes in cancer patients and may be useful for specific immunotherapy. This gene product is found to be an important cellular factor for HIV-1 gene expression and viral replication. It also associates transiently with U6 and U4/U6 snRNPs during the recycling phase of the spliceosome cycle. This encoded protein is thought to be involved in the regulation of mRNA splicing.

== Interactions ==
SART3 has been shown to interact with RNPS1 and Androgen receptor.
