= SNRPB2 =

Protein-coding gene in the species Homo sapiens

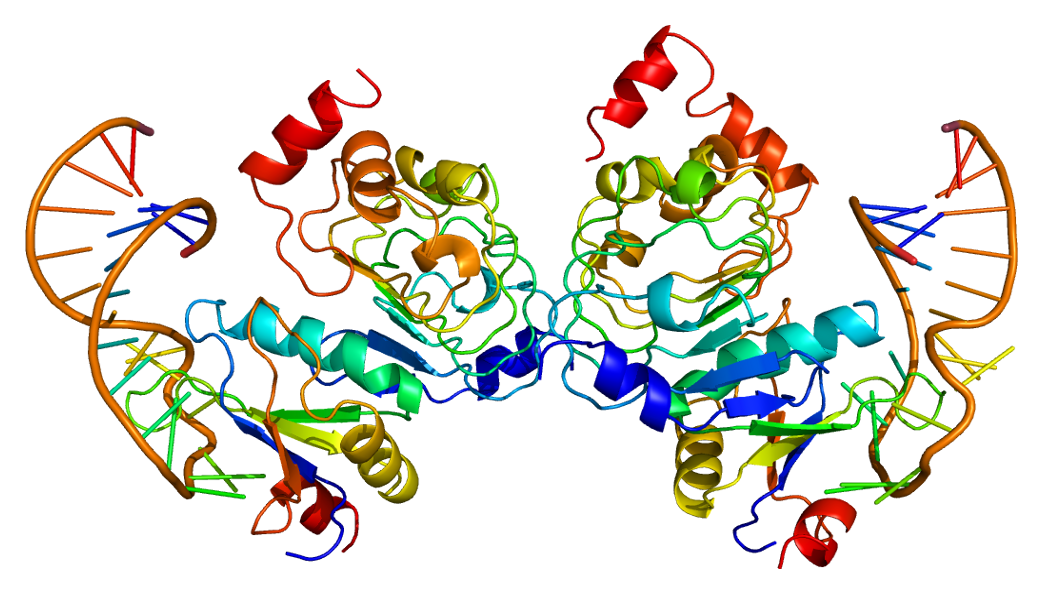

Identifiers
- Aliases: SNRPB2, Msl1, U2B'', small nuclear ribonucleoprotein polypeptide B2
- External IDs: OMIM: 603520; MGI: 104805; GeneCards: SNRPB2
Available structures
| PDB | Ortholog search: PDBe RCSB |
| PDB | List of PDB id codes 1A9N |

Gene location (Human)
| Chr. | Chromosome 20 (human) |
| Band | 20p12.1 | Start | 16,729,961 bp |
| Band | 20p12.1 | End | 16,742,564 bp |

Gene location (Mouse)
| Chr. | Chromosome 2 (mouse) |
| Band | 2|2 G1 | Start | 142,904,959 bp |
| Band | 2|2 G1 | End | 142,914,773 bp |
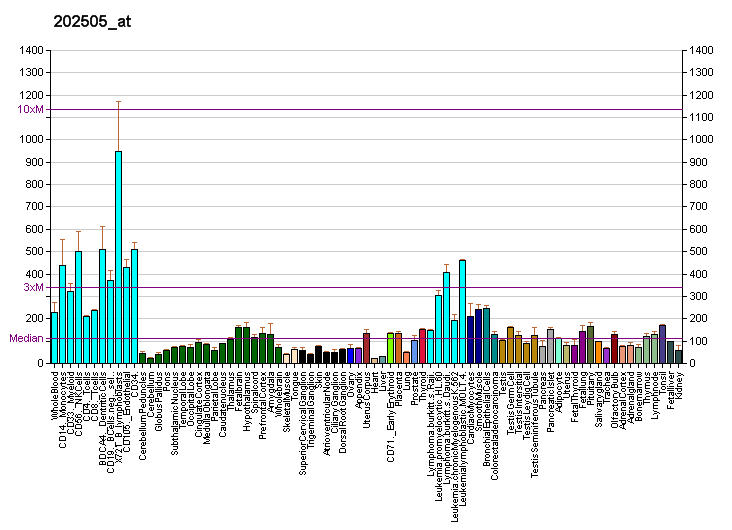
RNA expression pattern
| Bgee | Human / Mouse (ortholog); Top expressed in: oocyte; secondary oocyte; ganglionic eminence; Achilles tendon; monocyte; epithelium of nasopharynx; skin of hip; appendix; islet of Langerhans; superficial temporal artery / Top expressed in: medial ganglionic eminence; abdominal wall; primitive streak; maxillary prominence; mandibular prominence; dermis; otic placode; ventricular zone; cumulus cell; embryo; More reference expression data |
| BioGPS | More reference expression data |
Gene ontology
| Molecular function | nucleic acid binding; snRNA stem-loop binding; protein binding; RNA binding; snRNP binding; U1 snRNA binding |
| Cellular component | catalytic step 2 spliceosome; spliceosomal complex; U2 snRNP; small nuclear ribonucleoprotein complex; fibrillar center; nucleoplasm; nuclear speck; U1 snRNP; U2-type catalytic step 2 spliceosome; nucleus; U2-type precatalytic spliceosome |
| Biological process | mRNA processing; RNA splicing; mRNA splicing, via spliceosome |
Sources:Amigo / QuickGO
Orthologs
| Databases | NCBI: entry; OMA: entry |
| Species | Human | Mouse |
| Entrez | 6629 | 20639 |
| Ensembl | ENSG00000125870 | ENSMUSG00000008333 |
| UniProt | P08579 | Q9CQI7 |
| RefSeq (mRNA) | NM_198220; NM_003092 | NM_021335 |
| RefSeq (protein) | NP_003083; NP_937863 | NP_067310 |
| Location (UCSC) | Chr 20: 16.73 – 16.74 Mb | Chr 2: 142.9 – 142.91 Mb |
| PubMed search |
- Wikidata
| View/Edit Human | View/Edit Mouse |

U2 small nuclear ribonucleoprotein B is a protein that in humans is encoded by the SNRPB2 gene.

The protein encoded by this gene associates with stem loop IV of U2 small nuclear ribonucleoprotein (U2 snRNP) in the presence of snRNP-A'. The encoded protein may play a role in pre-mRNA splicing. Autoantibodies from patients with systemic lupus erythematosus frequently recognize epitopes on the encoded protein. Two transcript variants encoding the same protein have been found for this gene.
