= ZRSR1 =

Pseudogene in the species Homo sapiens

ZRSR2P1

Identifiers
- Aliases: ZRSR2P1, U2AF1-RS1, U2AF1L1, U2AF1P, U2AF1RS1, U2AFBPL, ZC3H21, zinc finger CCCH-type, RNA binding motif and serine/arginine rich 1, ZRSR1, ZRSR2 pseudogene 1
- External IDs: OMIM: 601079; GeneCards: ZRSR2P1; OMA:ZRSR2P1 - orthologs

Gene location (Human)
Chr.	Chromosome 5 (human)
Band	5q22.2	Start	112,891,610 bp
Band	5q22.2	End	112,893,079 bp
RNA expression pattern
Bgee	Human / Mouse (ortholog); Top expressed in: gonad; sural nerve; testicle; Achilles tendon; primary visual cortex; ganglionic eminence; gastric mucosa; white blood cell; monocyte; cerebellum / n/a; More reference expression data
BioGPS	n/a
Orthologs
Species	Human	Mouse
Entrez	7310	n/a
Ensembl	ENSG00000212643	n/a
UniProt	n a	n/a
RefSeq (mRNA)	NM_005083	n/a
RefSeq (protein)	n/a	n/a
Location (UCSC)	Chr 5: 112.89 – 112.89 Mb	n/a
PubMed search		n/a
- Wikidata
View/Edit Human

U2 small nuclear ribonucleoprotein auxiliary factor 35 kDa subunit-related protein 1 is a protein that in humans is encoded by the ZRSR1 gene.
