= MYEF2 =

Protein-coding gene in the species Homo sapiens

Identifiers
- Aliases: MYEF2, HsT18564, MEF-2, MST156, MSTP156, myEF-2, myelin expression factor 2
- External IDs: MGI: 104592; GeneCards: MYEF2

Gene location (Mouse)
Chr.	Chromosome 2 (mouse)
Band	2 F1|2 61.16 cM	Start	124,926,548 bp
Band	2 F1|2 61.16 cM	End	124,965,581 bp
RNA expression pattern
Bgee	Human / Mouse (ortholog); Top expressed in: ganglionic eminence; gastric mucosa; right uterine tube; anterior pituitary; ascending aorta; right coronary artery; body of pancreas; caput epididymis; retinal pigment epithelium; cerebellar vermis / Top expressed in: ventricular zone; neural layer of retina; ganglionic eminence; genital tubercle; neural tube; epiblast; tail of embryo; medial ganglionic eminence; spermatocyte; dentate gyrus of hippocampal formation granule cell; More reference expression data
BioGPS	n/a
Gene ontology
Molecular function	DNA binding; protein binding; nucleic acid binding; RNA binding; DNA-binding transcription factor activity, RNA polymerase II-specific; single-stranded DNA binding; RNA polymerase II cis-regulatory region sequence-specific DNA binding; DNA-binding transcription repressor activity, RNA polymerase II-specific; mRNA binding
Cellular component	nucleus; cytoplasm; post-mRNA release spliceosomal complex; ribonucleoprotein complex
Biological process	myotube differentiation; transcription, DNA-templated; neuron differentiation; regulation of transcription by RNA polymerase II; negative regulation of transcription by RNA polymerase II; regulation of mRNA stability involved in response to oxidative stress
Sources:Amigo / QuickGO
Orthologs
Databases	NCBI: entry
Species	Human	Mouse
Entrez	50804	17876
Ensembl	n/a	ENSMUSG00000027201
UniProt	Q9P2K5	Q8C854
RefSeq (mRNA)	NM_001301210; NM_016132	NM_001162417; NM_001162418; NM_010852
RefSeq (protein)	NP_001288139; NP_057216	NP_001155889; NP_001155890; NP_034982; NP_001388772
Location (UCSC)	n/a	Chr 2: 124.93 – 124.97 Mb
PubMed search
- Wikidata
View/Edit Human	View/Edit Mouse

Myelin expression factor 2 is a protein that in humans is encoded by the MYEF2 gene.
