= RBM19 =

Protein-coding gene in the species Homo sapiens

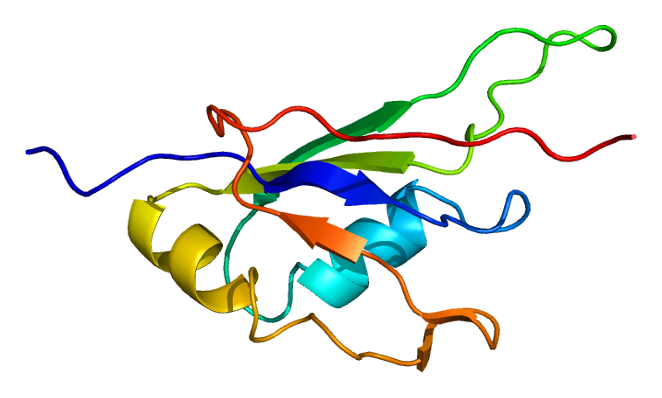

Identifiers
- Aliases: RBM19, RNA binding motif protein 19, Mrd1
- External IDs: OMIM: 616444; MGI: 1921361; GeneCards: RBM19
Available structures
PDB	Ortholog search: PDBe RCSB
PDB	List of PDB id codes 2DGW

Gene location (Human)
Chr.	Chromosome 12 (human)
Band	12q24.13-q24.21	Start	113,816,738 bp
Band	12q24.13-q24.21	End	113,966,325 bp

Gene location (Mouse)
Chr.	Chromosome 5 (mouse)
Band	5|5 F	Start	120,254,530 bp
Band	5|5 F	End	120,337,046 bp
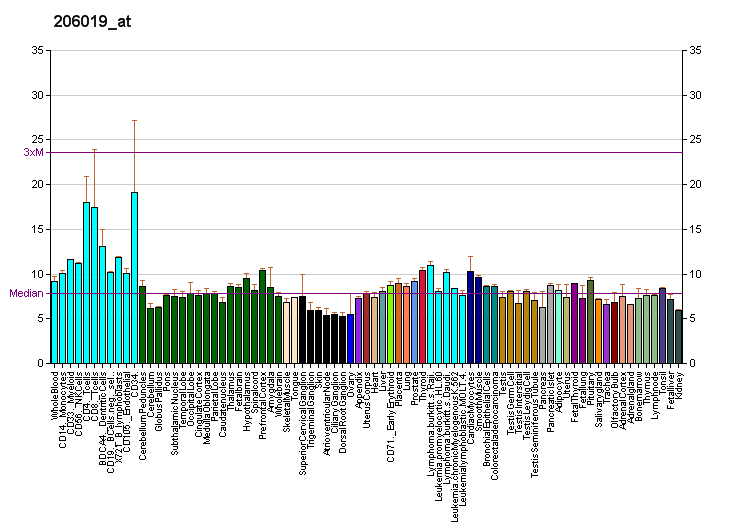
RNA expression pattern
Bgee	Human / Mouse (ortholog); Top expressed in: sural nerve; left lobe of thyroid gland; right lobe of thyroid gland; right uterine tube; left ovary; apex of heart; right ovary; left adrenal cortex; right adrenal cortex; body of uterus / Top expressed in: yolk sac; tail of embryo; interventricular septum; zygote; genital tubercle; epiblast; spermatocyte; morula; internal carotid artery; embryo; More reference expression data
BioGPS	More reference expression data
Gene ontology
Molecular function	nucleic acid binding; RNA binding
Cellular component	cytoplasm; nucleolus; membrane; nucleoplasm; chromosome; nucleus; nuclear speck
Biological process	multicellular organism development; positive regulation of embryonic development; regulation of alternative mRNA splicing, via spliceosome; mRNA cis splicing, via spliceosome
Sources:Amigo / QuickGO
Orthologs
Databases	NCBI: entry; OMA: entry
Species	Human	Mouse
Entrez	9904	74111
Ensembl	ENSG00000122965	ENSMUSG00000029594
UniProt	Q9Y4C8	Q8R3C6
RefSeq (mRNA)	NM_001146698; NM_001146699; NM_016196	NM_028762
RefSeq (protein)	NP_001140170; NP_001140171; NP_057280	NP_083038
Location (UCSC)	Chr 12: 113.82 – 113.97 Mb	Chr 5: 120.25 – 120.34 Mb
PubMed search
- Wikidata
View/Edit Human	View/Edit Mouse

Probable RNA-binding protein 19 is a protein that in humans is encoded by the RBM19 gene.
