= CUGBP Elav-like family member 4 =

Protein-coding gene in the species Homo sapiens

CELF4
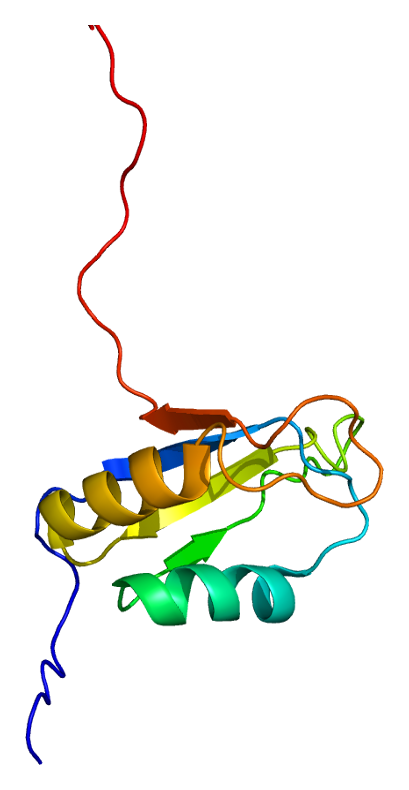

Identifiers
- Aliases: CELF4, BRUNOL-4, BRUNOL4, CELF-4, CUGBP, Elav-like family member 4, CUGBP Elav-like family member 4
- External IDs: OMIM: 612679; MGI: 1932407; GeneCards: CELF4
Available structures
PDB	Ortholog search: PDBe RCSB
PDB	List of PDB id codes 2DGP, 2DNK

Gene location (Mouse)
Chr.	Chromosome 18 (mouse)
Band	18|18 A2	Start	25,477,632 bp
Band	18|18 A2	End	25,754,157 bp
Gene ontology
Molecular function	RNA binding; BRE binding; mRNA binding; nucleic acid binding; translation repressor activity, mRNA regulatory element binding; pre-mRNA binding
Cellular component	cytoplasm; nucleus; ribonucleoprotein complex
Biological process	germ cell development; mRNA processing; negative regulation of mRNA splicing, via spliceosome; alternative mRNA splicing, via spliceosome; mRNA splice site selection; regulation of alternative mRNA splicing, via spliceosome; negative regulation of excitatory postsynaptic potential; RNA splicing; positive regulation of mRNA splicing, via spliceosome; negative regulation of translation; regulation of retina development in camera-type eye; embryo development ending in birth or egg hatching
Sources:Amigo / QuickGO
Orthologs
Databases	NCBI: entry; OMA: entry
Species	Human	Mouse
Entrez	56853	108013
Ensembl	ENSG00000101489	ENSMUSG00000024268
UniProt	Q9BZC1	Q7TSY6
RefSeq (mRNA)	NM_001025087; NM_001025088; NM_001025089; NM_020180; NM_001330603	NM_001146292; NM_001146293; NM_001146294; NM_001146295; NM_001174074 NM_133195
RefSeq (protein)	NP_001020258; NP_001020259; NP_001020260; NP_001317532; NP_064565 NP_001340624; NP_001340625; NP_001340626; NP_001340627; NP_001340628; NP_001340629; NP_001340630; NP_001340631; NP_001340632; NP_001340634; NP_001340635; NP_001340637; NP_001340638; NP_001340639; NP_001340640; NP_001340641; NP_001340642; NP_001340643; NP_001340644; NP_001340645; NP_001340646; NP_001340647; NP_001340648; NP_001340649; NP_001340650; NP_001340651; NP_001340652; NP_001340653; NP_001340654; NP_001340655; NP_001340656; NP_001340657; NP_001340658; NP_001340659; NP_001340660; NP_001340661; NP_001340662; NP_001340663; NP_001340664; NP_001340665; NP_001340666; NP_001340667; NP_001340668; NP_001340669; NP_001340670; NP_001340671; NP_001340672; NP_001340673; NP_001340674; NP_001340675; NP_001340676; NP_001340677; NP_001340678; NP_001340679; NP_001340680; NP_001340681; NP_001340682; NP_001340683; NP_001340684; NP_001340685; NP_001340686; NP_001340687; NP_001340688; NP_001340689; NP_001340690; NP_001340636	NP_001139764; NP_001139765; NP_001139766; NP_001167545; NP_573458 NP_001349204; NP_001349205; NP_001349206; NP_001349207; NP_001349208; NP_001349209; NP_001349210; NP_001349211; NP_001349212; NP_001349213; NP_001349214; NP_001349215; NP_001349217; NP_001349218; NP_001349219; NP_001349220; NP_001349221; NP_001349222; NP_001349223; NP_001349224; NP_001349226; NP_001349228; NP_001349229; NP_001349230; NP_001349231; NP_001349232; NP_001349237; NP_001349238; NP_001349239; NP_001349240; NP_001349242; NP_001349244; NP_001349245; NP_001349252; NP_001349253; NP_001349254; NP_001349255; NP_001349256; NP_001349257; NP_001349258; NP_001349259; NP_001349260; NP_001349261; NP_001349263; NP_001349264; NP_001349265; NP_001349266; NP_001349233; NP_001349251
Location (UCSC)	n/a	Chr 18: 25.48 – 25.75 Mb
PubMed search
- Wikidata
View/Edit Human	View/Edit Mouse

CUGBP Elav-like family member 4 (CELF4) also known as bruno-like protein 4 (BRUNOL4) is a protein that in humans is encoded by the CELF4 gene.

== Function ==
Members of the CELF/BRUNOL protein family contain two N-terminal RNA recognition motif (RRM) domains, one C-terminal RRM domain, and a divergent segment of 160-230 aa between the second and third RRM domains. Members of this protein family regulate pre-mRNA alternative splicing and may also be involved in mRNA editing, and translation. Several transcript variants encoding different isoforms have been found for this gene, but their full-length nature has not been determined yet.
