= RBM23 =

Protein-coding gene in the species Homo sapiens

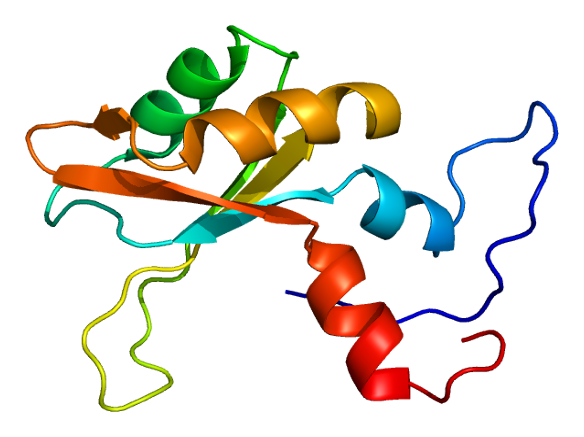

Identifiers
- Aliases: RBM23, CAPERbeta, RNPC4, PP239, RNA binding motif protein 23
- External IDs: GeneCards: RBM23
Available structures
PDB	Human UniProt search: PDBe RCSB
PDB	List of PDB id codes 2CQ4, 2DNZ

Gene location (Human)
Chr.	Chromosome 14 (human)
Band	14q11.2	Start	22,893,204 bp
Band	14q11.2	End	22,919,182 bp
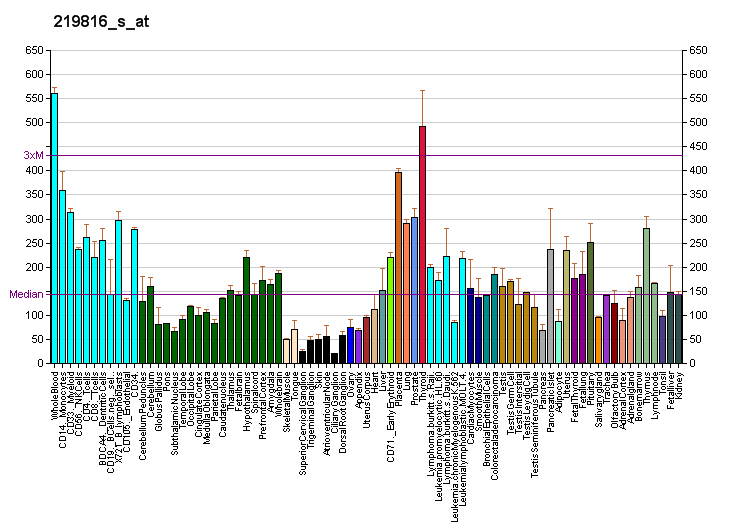
RNA expression pattern
Bgee	Human / Mouse (ortholog); Top expressed in: Achilles tendon; right uterine tube; left ovary; right lobe of thyroid gland; islet of Langerhans; body of uterus; ventricular zone; left lobe of thyroid gland; right ovary; monocyte / n/a; More reference expression data
BioGPS	More reference expression data
Gene ontology
Molecular function	protein binding; RNA binding; nucleic acid binding; mRNA binding; U1 snRNP binding
Cellular component	membrane; nucleus; cytoplasmic stress granule; ribonucleoprotein complex
Biological process	mRNA processing; 3'-UTR-mediated mRNA destabilization
Sources:Amigo / QuickGO
Orthologs
Databases	NCBI: entry; OMA: entry
Species	Human	Mouse
Entrez	55147	n/a
Ensembl	ENSG00000100461	n/a
UniProt	Q86U06	n/a
RefSeq (mRNA)	NM_001077351; NM_001077352; NM_001308044; NM_018107; NM_001352762 NM_001352763; NM_001352764; NM_001352765; NM_001352766	n/a
RefSeq (protein)	NP_001070819; NP_001070820; NP_001294973; NP_060577; NP_001339691 NP_001339692; NP_001339693; NP_001339694; NP_001339695	n/a
Location (UCSC)	Chr 14: 22.89 – 22.92 Mb	n/a
PubMed search		n/a
- Wikidata
View/Edit Human

Probable RNA-binding protein 23 is a protein that in humans is encoded by the RBM23 gene.

== Function ==
This gene encodes a member of the U2AF-like family of RNA binding proteins. This protein interacts with some steroid nuclear receptors, localizes to the promoter of a steroid- responsive gene, and increases transcription of steroid-responsive transcriptional reporters in a hormone-dependent manner. It is also implicated in the steroid receptor-dependent regulation of alternative splicing. Multiple transcript variants encoding different isoforms have been found for this gene.
