= RBM25 =

Protein-coding gene in the species Homo sapiens

Identifiers
- Aliases: RBM25, NET52, RED120, RNPC7, S164, Snu71, fSAP94, RNA binding motif protein 25
- External IDs: OMIM: 612427; MGI: 1914289; GeneCards: RBM25
Available structures
PDB	Ortholog search: PDBe RCSB
PDB	List of PDB id codes 3V53

Gene location (Human)
Chr.	Chromosome 14 (human)
Band	14q24.2	Start	73,058,532 bp
Band	14q24.2	End	73,123,899 bp

Gene location (Mouse)
Chr.	Chromosome 12 (mouse)
Band	12|12 D1	Start	83,631,236 bp
Band	12|12 D1	End	83,683,123 bp
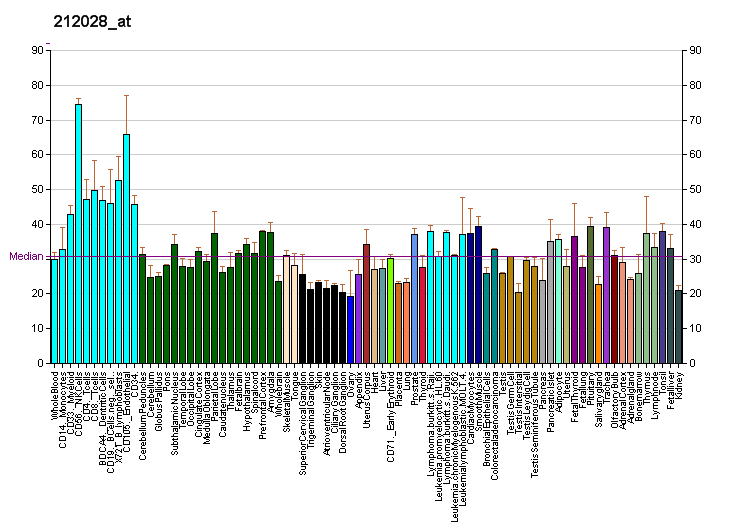

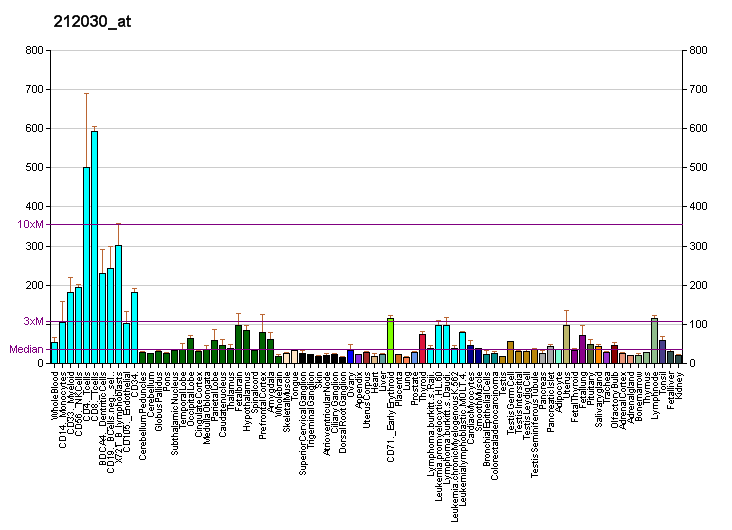

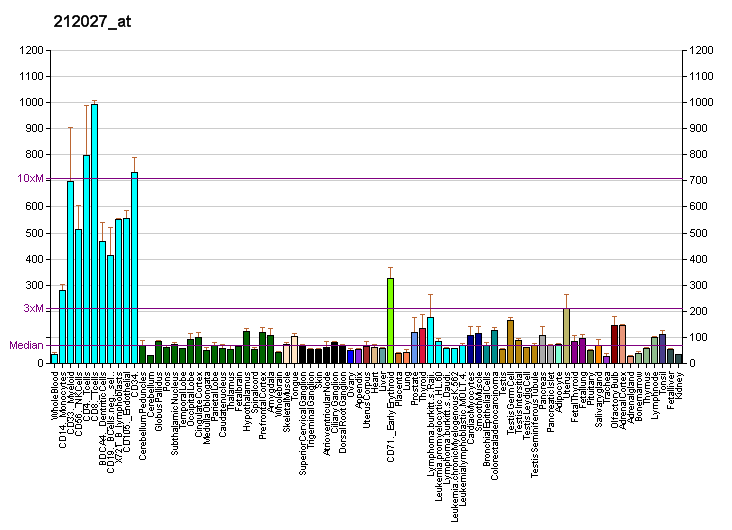
RNA expression pattern
Bgee	Human / Mouse (ortholog); Top expressed in: tendon of biceps brachii; sural nerve; internal globus pallidus; visceral pleura; Brodmann area 23; pylorus; parietal pleura; cardia; pericardium; buccal mucosa cell / Top expressed in: genital tubercle; tail of embryo; neural layer of retina; zygote; yolk sac; embryo; ventricular zone; neural tube; embryo; epiblast; More reference expression data
BioGPS	More reference expression data
Gene ontology
Molecular function	protein binding; mRNA binding; nucleic acid binding; RNA binding
Cellular component	cytoplasm; nuclear speck; spliceosomal complex; nucleus
Biological process	regulation of apoptotic process; mRNA processing; regulation of alternative mRNA splicing, via spliceosome; RNA splicing
Sources:Amigo / QuickGO
Orthologs
Databases	NCBI: entry; OMA: entry
Species	Human	Mouse
Entrez	58517	67039
Ensembl	ENSG00000119707	ENSMUSG00000010608
UniProt	P49756	B2RY56
RefSeq (mRNA)	NM_021239	NM_027349; NM_001364415; NM_001364416
RefSeq (protein)	NP_067062	NP_081625; NP_001351344; NP_001351345
Location (UCSC)	Chr 14: 73.06 – 73.12 Mb	Chr 12: 83.63 – 83.68 Mb
PubMed search
- Wikidata
View/Edit Human	View/Edit Mouse

RNA-binding protein 25 is a protein that in humans is encoded by the RBM25 gene.
