= RALYL =

Protein-coding gene in the species Homo sapiens

Identifiers
- Aliases: RALYL, HNRPCL3, RALY RNA binding protein-like, RALY RNA binding protein like
- External IDs: OMIM: 614648; MGI: 1924147; GeneCards: RALYL

Gene location (Human)
| Chr. | Chromosome 8 (human) |
| Band | 8q21.2 | Start | 84,182,787 bp |
| Band | 8q21.2 | End | 84,921,844 bp |

Gene location (Mouse)
| Chr. | Chromosome 3 (mouse) |
| Band | 3|3 A1 | Start | 13,536,715 bp |
| Band | 3|3 A1 | End | 14,247,347 bp |
RNA expression pattern
| Bgee | Human / Mouse (ortholog); Top expressed in: endothelial cell; cerebellar vermis; middle temporal gyrus; Brodmann area 23; cerebellar hemisphere; orbitofrontal cortex; dorsolateral prefrontal cortex; right hemisphere of cerebellum; superior frontal gyrus; Brodmann area 9 / Top expressed in: mammillary body; lateral septal nucleus; dorsomedial hypothalamic nucleus; Region I of hippocampus proper; dorsal tegmental nucleus; ventral tegmental area; habenula; dentate gyrus of hippocampal formation granule cell; visual cortex; lateral hypothalamus; More reference expression data |
| BioGPS | n/a |
Orthologs
| Databases | NCBI: entry; OMA: entry |
| Species | Human | Mouse |
| Entrez | 138046 | 76897 |
| Ensembl | ENSG00000184672 | ENSMUSG00000039717 |
| UniProt | Q86SE5 | Q8BTF8 |
| RefSeq (mRNA) | NM_001100391; NM_001100392; NM_001100393; NM_001287243; NM_001287244 NM_173848; NM_001354305; NM_001354306; NM_001354307; NM_001354310; NM_001354311; NM_001354312; NM_001354313; NM_001354314; NM_001354315; NM_001354316; NM_001354318; NM_001354320; NM_001354321; NM_001354322; NM_001354323; NM_001354325; NM_001354308; NM_001354309; NM_001354317; NM_001354319 | NM_001163328; NM_001163329; NM_001163330; NM_178631; NM_001357033 NM_001357034; NM_001357035; NM_001357036 |
| RefSeq (protein) | NP_001093861; NP_001093862; NP_001093863; NP_001274172; NP_001274173 NP_776247; NP_001341234; NP_001341235; NP_001341236; NP_001341239; NP_001341240; NP_001341241; NP_001341242; NP_001341243; NP_001341244; NP_001341245; NP_001341247; NP_001341249; NP_001341250; NP_001341251; NP_001341252; NP_001341254; NP_001341237; NP_001341238; NP_001341246; NP_001341248 | NP_001156800; NP_001156801; NP_001156802; NP_848746; NP_001343962 NP_001343963; NP_001343964; NP_001343965 |
| Location (UCSC) | Chr 8: 84.18 – 84.92 Mb | Chr 3: 13.54 – 14.25 Mb |
| PubMed search |
- Wikidata
| View/Edit Human | View/Edit Mouse |

RNA-binding Raly-like protein is a protein that in humans is encoded by the RALYL gene.
