= RBM17 =

Protein-coding gene in the species Homo sapiens

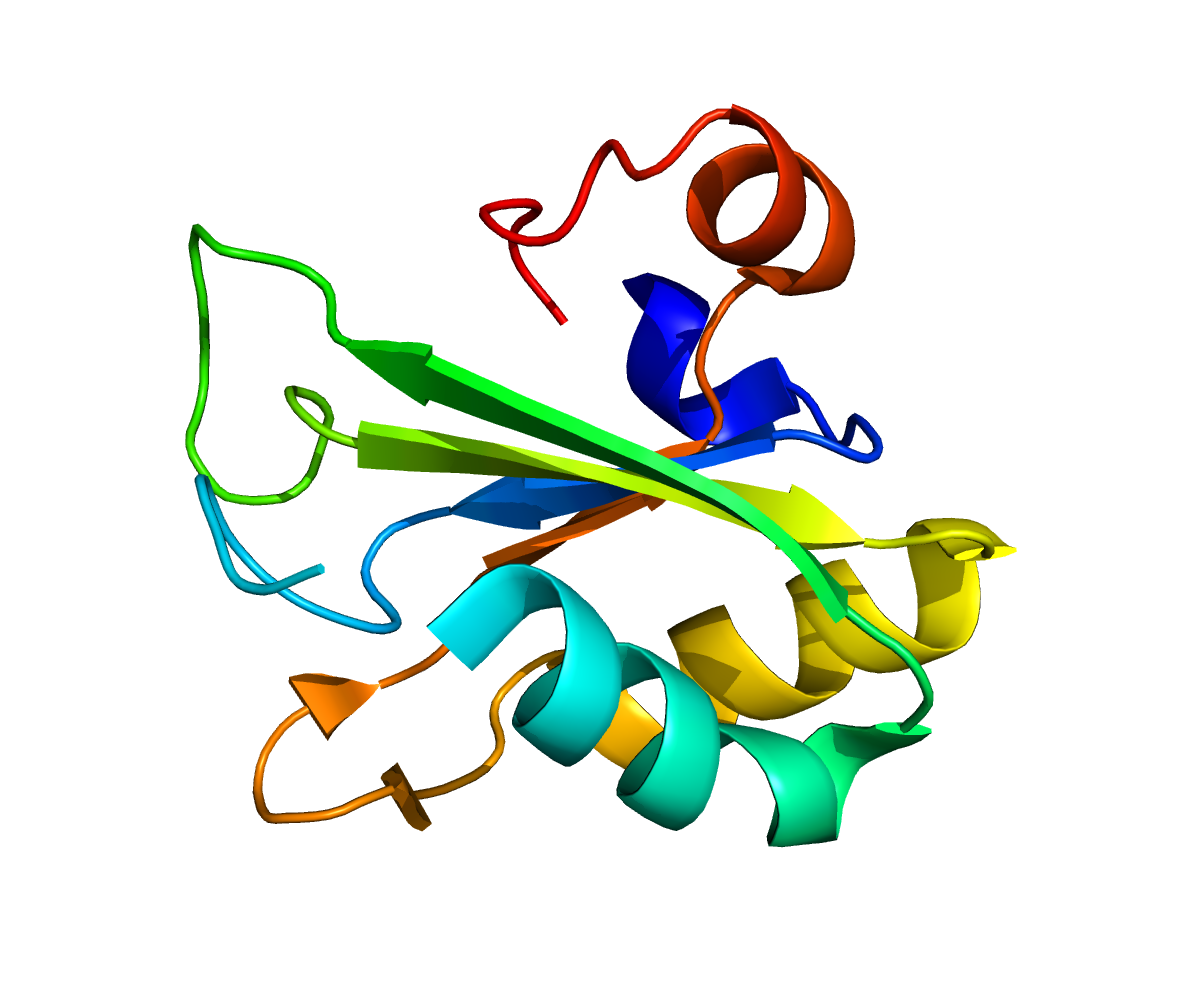

Identifiers
- Aliases: RBM17, SPF45, RNA binding motif protein 17
- External IDs: OMIM: 606935; MGI: 1924188; GeneCards: RBM17
Available structures
PDB	Ortholog search: PDBe RCSB
PDB	List of PDB id codes 2PE8, 2PEH

Gene location (Human)
Chr.	Chromosome 10 (human)
Band	10p15.1	Start	6,089,034 bp
Band	10p15.1	End	6,117,457 bp

Gene location (Mouse)
Chr.	Chromosome 2 (mouse)
Band	2|2 A1	Start	11,590,248 bp
Band	2|2 A1	End	11,608,964 bp
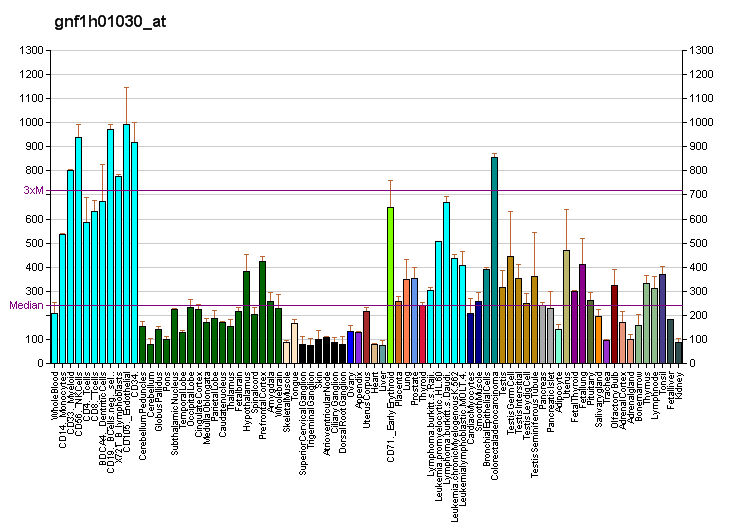

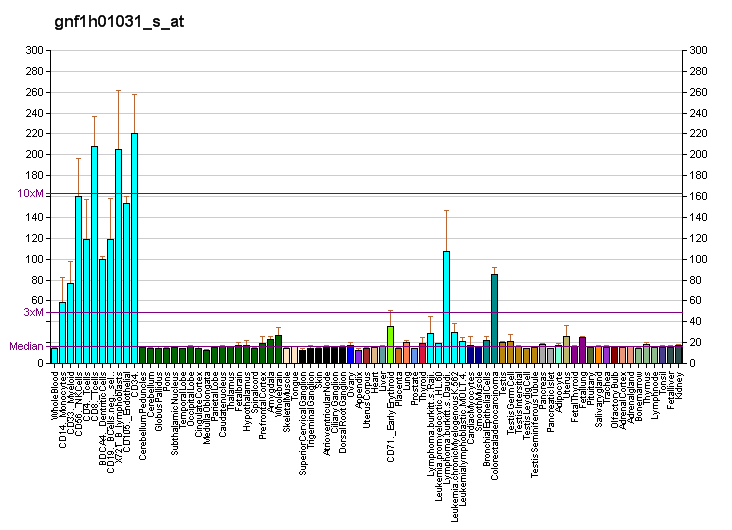
RNA expression pattern
Bgee	Human / Mouse (ortholog); Top expressed in: left lobe of thyroid gland; body of uterus; body of pancreas; spleen; right uterine tube; right lobe of thyroid gland; right lung; upper lobe of left lung; appendix; left uterine tube / Top expressed in: tail of embryo; epiblast; Ileal epithelium; secondary oocyte; zygote; ventricular zone; primary oocyte; neural layer of retina; genital tubercle; renal corpuscle; More reference expression data
BioGPS	More reference expression data
Gene ontology
Molecular function	protein binding; RNA binding; nucleic acid binding
Cellular component	spliceosomal complex; nucleus; nucleoplasm; protein-containing complex
Biological process	mRNA processing; alternative mRNA splicing, via spliceosome; RNA splicing; mRNA splicing, via spliceosome; DNA repair; regulation of RNA splicing; regulation of alternative mRNA splicing, via spliceosome
Sources:Amigo / QuickGO
Orthologs
Databases	NCBI: entry; OMA: entry
Species	Human	Mouse
Entrez	84991	76938
Ensembl	ENSG00000134453	ENSMUSG00000037197
UniProt	Q96I25	Q8JZX4
RefSeq (mRNA)	NM_032905; NM_001145547	NM_152824
RefSeq (protein)	NP_001139019; NP_116294	NP_690037
Location (UCSC)	Chr 10: 6.09 – 6.12 Mb	Chr 2: 11.59 – 11.61 Mb
PubMed search
- Wikidata
View/Edit Human	View/Edit Mouse

Splicing factor 45 is a protein that in humans is encoded by the RBM17 gene.
