= RBM33 =

Protein-coding gene in the species Homo sapiens

Identifiers
- Aliases: RBM33, PRR8, RNA binding motif protein 33
- External IDs: MGI: 1919670; GeneCards: RBM33

Gene location (Human)
Chr.	Chromosome 7 (human)
Band	7q36.3	Start	155,644,451 bp
Band	7q36.3	End	155,781,485 bp

Gene location (Mouse)
Chr.	Chromosome 5 (mouse)
Band	5|5 B1	Start	28,522,119 bp
Band	5|5 B1	End	28,624,237 bp
RNA expression pattern
Bgee	Human / Mouse (ortholog); Top expressed in: Achilles tendon; sural nerve; bone marrow cell; thymus; tendon of biceps brachii; tibialis anterior muscle; buccal mucosa cell; epithelium of colon; mucosa of ileum; right hemisphere of cerebellum / Top expressed in: hand; blood; superior cervical ganglion; otolith organ; neural layer of retina; utricle; zygote; muscle of thigh; granulocyte; secondary oocyte; More reference expression data
BioGPS	n/a
Orthologs
Databases	NCBI: entry; OMA: entry
Species	Human	Mouse
Entrez	155435	381626
Ensembl	ENSG00000184863	ENSMUSG00000048271
UniProt	Q96EV2	Q9CXK9
RefSeq (mRNA)	NM_001008408; NM_053043	NM_028234
RefSeq (protein)	NP_444271	NP_082510
Location (UCSC)	Chr 7: 155.64 – 155.78 Mb	Chr 5: 28.52 – 28.62 Mb
PubMed search
- Wikidata
View/Edit Human	View/Edit Mouse

RNA-binding protein 33 is a protein that in humans is encoded by the RBM33 gene.
