= RAVER1 =

Protein-coding gene in the species Homo sapiens

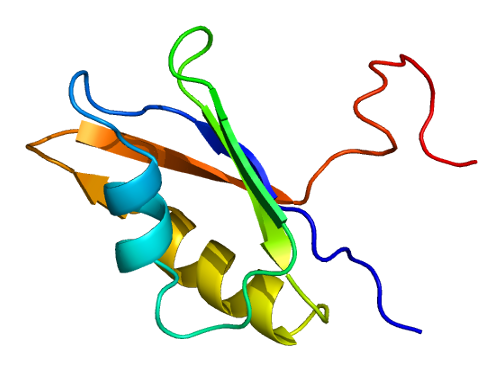

Identifiers
- Aliases: RAVER1, ribonucleoprotein, PTB binding 1
- External IDs: OMIM: 609950; MGI: 1919016; GeneCards: RAVER1
Available structures
| PDB | Ortholog search: PDBe RCSB |
| PDB | List of PDB id codes 3H2U, 3H2V, 3SMZ, 3VF0 |

Gene location (Human)
| Chr. | Chromosome 19 (human) |
| Band | 19p13.2 | Start | 10,316,212 bp |
| Band | 19p13.2 | End | 10,333,638 bp |

Gene location (Mouse)
| Chr. | Chromosome 9 (mouse) |
| Band | 9|9 A3 | Start | 20,985,454 bp |
| Band | 9|9 A3 | End | 21,003,304 bp |
RNA expression pattern
| Bgee | Human / Mouse (ortholog); Top expressed in: granulocyte; mucosa of transverse colon; blood; ventricular zone; left uterine tube; stromal cell of endometrium; bone marrow cell; right uterine tube; right ovary; body of uterus / Top expressed in: zygote; secondary oocyte; primary oocyte; tail of embryo; epiblast; genital tubercle; ventricular zone; thymus; adrenal gland; yolk sac; More reference expression data |
| BioGPS | n/a |
Gene ontology
| Molecular function | nucleic acid binding; RNA binding; protein binding |
| Cellular component | nucleus; cytoplasm |
| Biological process | mRNA splicing, via spliceosome |
Sources:Amigo / QuickGO
Orthologs
| Databases | NCBI: entry; OMA: entry |
| Species | Human | Mouse |
| Entrez | 125950 | 71766 |
| Ensembl | ENSG00000161847 | ENSMUSG00000010205 |
| UniProt | Q8IY67 | Q9CW46 |
| RefSeq (mRNA) | NM_133452; NM_001366174 | NM_027911 |
| RefSeq (protein) | NP_597709; NP_001353103 | NP_082187 |
| Location (UCSC) | Chr 19: 10.32 – 10.33 Mb | Chr 9: 20.99 – 21 Mb |
| PubMed search |
- Wikidata
| View/Edit Human | View/Edit Mouse |

Ribonucleoprotein, PTB-binding 1 (also known as RAVER1), is a human gene.
