= TRA2A =

Protein-coding gene in the species Homo sapiens

Identifiers
- Aliases: TRA2A, AWMS1, HSU53209, transformer 2 alpha homolog
- External IDs: OMIM: 602718; MGI: 1933972; GeneCards: TRA2A

Gene location (Human)
Chr.	Chromosome 7 (human)
Band	7p15.3	Start	23,504,780 bp
Band	7p15.3	End	23,532,041 bp

Gene location (Mouse)
Chr.	Chromosome 6 (mouse)
Band	6|6 B2.3	Start	49,220,858 bp
Band	6|6 B2.3	End	49,240,967 bp
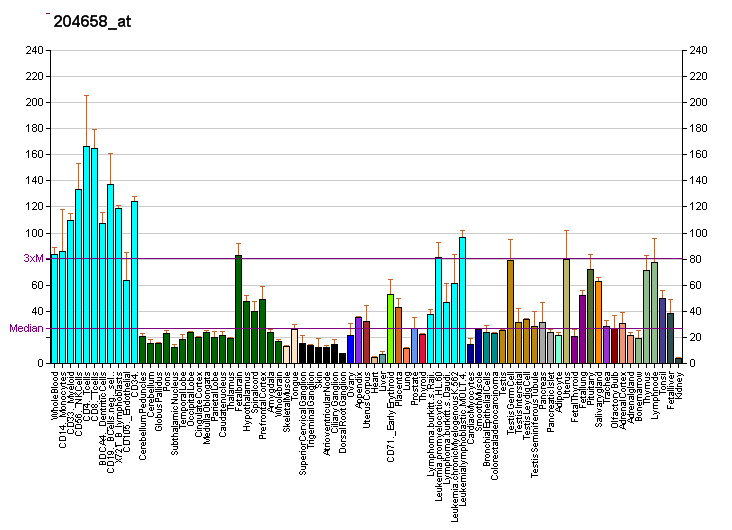
RNA expression pattern
Bgee	Human / Mouse (ortholog); Top expressed in: right uterine tube; buccal mucosa cell; right ovary; ganglionic eminence; left ovary; ventricular zone; canal of the cervix; sural nerve; body of uterus; right lobe of thyroid gland / Top expressed in: pineal gland; Gonadal ridge; abdominal wall; maxillary prominence; mandibular prominence; tail of embryo; dermis; superior cervical ganglion; epiblast; ventricular zone; More reference expression data
BioGPS	More reference expression data
Gene ontology
Molecular function	nucleic acid binding; RNA binding
Cellular component	nucleolus; intracellular membrane-bounded organelle; nucleus; ribonucleoprotein complex
Biological process	mRNA splicing, via spliceosome; mRNA processing; RNA splicing; positive regulation of mRNA splicing, via spliceosome
Sources:Amigo / QuickGO
Orthologs
Databases	NCBI: entry; OMA: entry
Species	Human	Mouse
Entrez	29896	101214
Ensembl	ENSG00000164548	ENSMUSG00000029817
UniProt	Q13595	Q6PFR5
RefSeq (mRNA)	NM_001282757; NM_001282758; NM_001282759; NM_013293; NM_001362759 NM_001362760; NM_001362761	NM_198102; NM_001347209; NM_001362188
RefSeq (protein)	NP_001269686; NP_001269687; NP_001269688; NP_037425; NP_001349688 NP_001349689; NP_001349690	n/a
Location (UCSC)	Chr 7: 23.5 – 23.53 Mb	Chr 6: 49.22 – 49.24 Mb
PubMed search
- Wikidata
View/Edit Human	View/Edit Mouse

Transformer-2 protein homolog alpha is a protein that in humans is encoded by the TRA2A gene.

This gene is a member of the transformer 2 homolog family and encodes a protein with two RS domains and an RRM (RNA recognition motif) domain. This phosphorylated nuclear protein binds to specific RNA sequences and plays a role in the regulation of pre-mRNA splicing. Several alternatively spliced transcript variants of this gene have been described; however, the full-length nature of some of these variants has not been determined.
