= RBM26 =

Protein-coding gene in the species Homo sapiens

Identifiers
- Aliases: RBM26, ARRS2, C13orf10, PPP1R132, SE70-2, ZC3H17, PRO1777, RNA binding motif protein 26
- External IDs: MGI: 1921463; GeneCards: RBM26

Gene location (Human)
| Chr. | Chromosome 13 (human) |
| Band | 13q31.1 | Start | 79,311,824 bp |
| Band | 13q31.1 | End | 79,406,477 bp |

Gene location (Mouse)
| Chr. | Chromosome 14 (mouse) |
| Band | 14|14 E2.3 | Start | 105,106,751 bp |
| Band | 14|14 E2.3 | End | 105,177,327 bp |
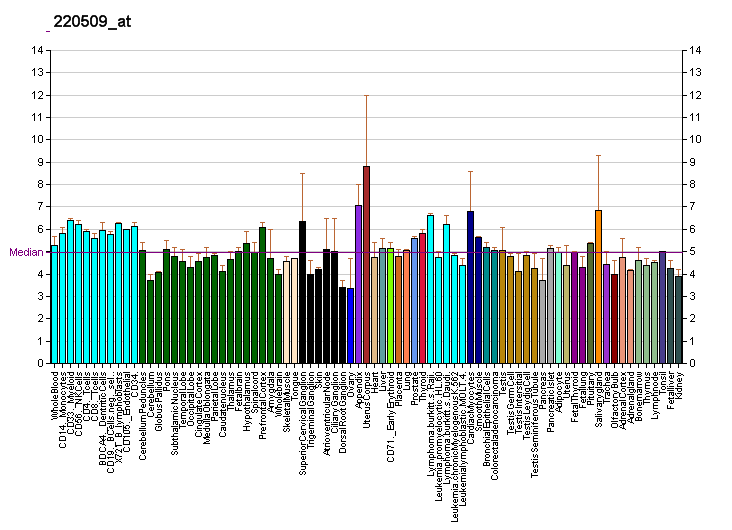

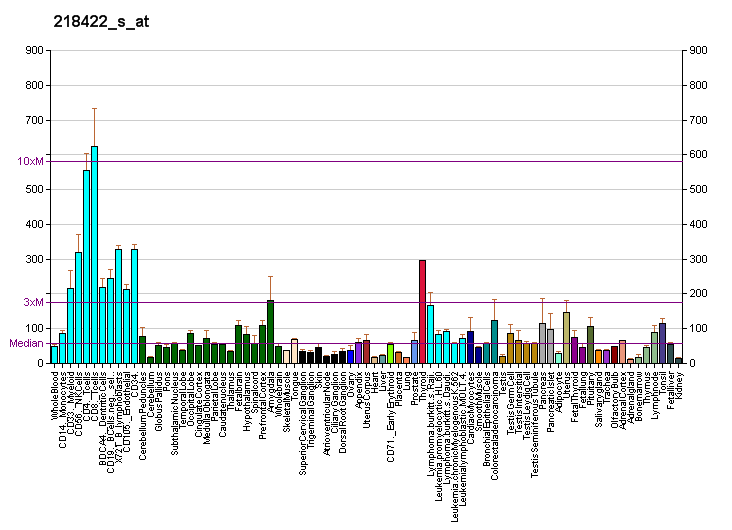
RNA expression pattern
| Bgee | Human / Mouse (ortholog); Top expressed in: pylorus; retinal pigment epithelium; cardia; Epithelium of choroid plexus; tibia; human penis; cerebellar vermis; epithelium of nasopharynx; visceral pleura; urethra / Top expressed in: zygote; genital tubercle; saccule; tail of embryo; Rostral migratory stream; otic vesicle; secondary oocyte; otic placode; ventricular zone; epiblast; More reference expression data |
| BioGPS | More reference expression data |
Gene ontology
| Molecular function | protein binding; metal ion binding; nucleic acid binding; RNA binding; mRNA binding |
| Cellular component | nucleus |
| Biological process | negative regulation of phosphatase activity; mRNA processing; positive regulation of RNA export from nucleus |
Sources:Amigo / QuickGO
Orthologs
| Databases | NCBI: entry; OMA: entry |
| Species | Human | Mouse |
| Entrez | 64062 | 74213 |
| Ensembl | ENSG00000139746 | ENSMUSG00000022119 |
| UniProt | Q5T8P6 | Q6NZN0 |
| RefSeq (mRNA) | NM_001286631; NM_001286632; NM_018605; NM_022118; NM_001366735 | NM_134077 |
| RefSeq (protein) | NP_001273560; NP_001273561; NP_071401; NP_001353664 | NP_598838; NP_001355612; NP_001355613; NP_001355614 |
| Location (UCSC) | Chr 13: 79.31 – 79.41 Mb | Chr 14: 105.11 – 105.18 Mb |
| PubMed search |
- Wikidata
| View/Edit Human | View/Edit Mouse |

RNA-binding protein 26 is a protein that in humans is encoded by the RBM26 gene.
