= RBM12 =

Protein-coding gene in the species Homo sapiens

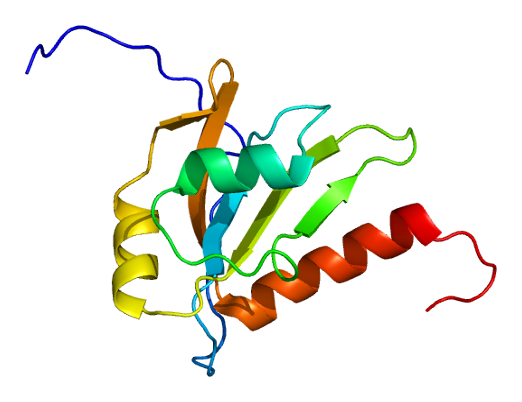

Identifiers
- Aliases: RBM12, HRIHFB2091, SWAN, RNA binding motif protein 12, SCZD19
- External IDs: OMIM: 607179; MGI: 1922960; GeneCards: RBM12
Available structures
PDB	Ortholog search: PDBe RCSB
PDB	List of PDB id codes 1WEL, 2CPY, 2DNN, 2EK1, 2EK6

Gene location (Human)
Chr.	Chromosome 20 (human)
Band	20q11.22	Start	35,648,925 bp
Band	20q11.22	End	35,664,956 bp

Gene location (Mouse)
Chr.	Chromosome 2 (mouse)
Band	2|2 H1	Start	155,933,878 bp
Band	2|2 H1	End	155,953,898 bp
RNA expression pattern
Bgee	Human / Mouse (ortholog); Top expressed in: Achilles tendon; epithelium of colon; secondary oocyte; bone marrow cell; embryo; ganglionic eminence; islet of Langerhans; amniotic fluid; ventricular zone; cartilage tissue / Top expressed in: primitive streak; tail of embryo; genital tubercle; abdominal wall; aortic valve; mandibular prominence; maxillary prominence; ureter; hair follicle; somite; More reference expression data
BioGPS	n/a
Orthologs
Databases	NCBI: entry; OMA: entry
Species	Human	Mouse
Entrez	10137	75710
Ensembl	ENSG00000244462	ENSMUSG00000089824
UniProt	Q9NTZ6	Q8R4X3
RefSeq (mRNA)	NM_152838; NM_001198838; NM_001198840; NM_006047	NM_029397; NM_170598
RefSeq (protein)	NP_001185767; NP_001185769; NP_006038; NP_690051	NP_083673; NP_733486
Location (UCSC)	Chr 20: 35.65 – 35.66 Mb	Chr 2: 155.93 – 155.95 Mb
PubMed search
- Wikidata
View/Edit Human	View/Edit Mouse

RNA-binding protein 12 is a protein that in humans is encoded by the RBM12 gene.

This gene encodes a protein that contains several RNA-binding motifs, potential transmembrane domains, and proline-rich regions. This gene and the gene for copine I overlap at map location 20q11.21. Alternative splicing in the 5' UTR results in two transcript variants. Both variants encode the same protein.

RMB12 is a protein encoded by the RBM12 gene and it still is not entirely known the full capacity, involvement, and function of the RBM12 protein, as of early 2026. There have been some studies that have linked the RMB12 protein in the suppression of fetal hemoglobin (HbF) production. In human fetuses, fetal hemoglobin is the primary oxygen-carrying protein in their red blood cells and facilitates the exchange of oxygen between the fetus and the mother. “RBM12 is a nuclear RBP with broad tissue expression that remains unchanged between fetal and erythroid stages (Wakabayashi, et al.).”^1 When primary erythroblasts and HeLa cells are stained with immunofluorescence, the staining showed RBM12 displaying nuclear localization suggesting it functions at pre-RNA level synthesis. It also showed to display expression across multiple different types of tissue and the expression does not seem to be developmentally selective. RBM12 has shown a preference in binding at the 5’UTR of its target mRNA’s.

== Sickle cell anemia ==
Hemoglobin is made up of four different subunits. In adults, hemoglobin is made up of two alpha subunits and two beta subunits. In a fetus, hemoglobin is made up of two identical alpha subunits, but instead of the beta subunits it is made up of two gamma subunits. Sickle cell disease is caused by a mutation in the beta subunits of hemoglobin. Since fetal hemoglobin does not have the beta subunits and instead has the gamma subunits, they are not affected by sickle cell disease. HbF, fetal hemoglobin, has recently begun to be studied as a possible treatment for sickle cell disease. “Increased levels of HbF can diminish the propensity of sickle cell hemoglobin to polymerize under hypoxic conditions and thus inhibit the pathognomonic changes in cell shape (Wakabayashi, et al.).”

== Mental health disorders ==
Studies have shown the RBM12 protein to have an influence on the development of different psychiatric disorders like schizophrenia and psychosis. “RBM12 is a high-penetrance risk factor for familial schizophrenia and psychosis… (Semesta, et al.).” The RBM12 protein can suppress the G protein-coupled receptor signaling axis. Loss of RMB12 can lead to a hyperactive cAMP production which then will increase PKA activity and can alter neuronal transcriptional responses.

== Other disorders ==
RBM12 has been linked to certain cancers as well. An increase in RBM12 expression has been linked to a negative prognosis in different types of cancers. Some of those cancers include Meibomian, a rare and aggressive cancer of the oil glands in the eyelids, and hepatocellular cell carcinoma. Various mutations in RBM12 have also been linked to some endometrial, colorectal, and kidney cancer diagnoses.
