= IGF2BP3 =

Protein-coding gene in the species Homo sapiens

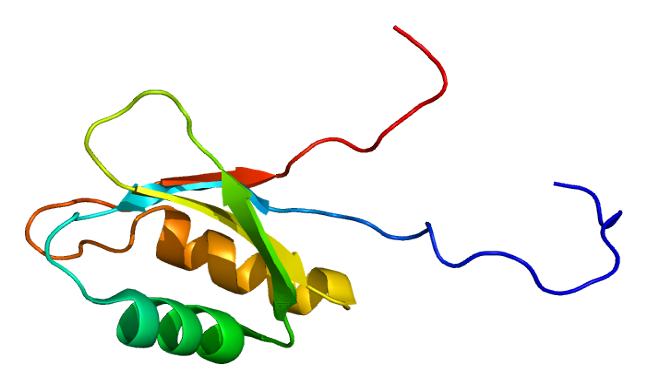

Identifiers
- Aliases: IGF2BP3, CT98, IMP-3, IMP3, KOC, KOC1, VICKZ3, insulin like growth factor 2 mRNA binding protein 3
- External IDs: OMIM: 608259; MGI: 1890359; GeneCards: IGF2BP3
Available structures
PDB	Ortholog search: PDBe RCSB
PDB	List of PDB id codes 2E44

Gene location (Human)
Chr.	Chromosome 7 (human)
Band	7p15.3	Start	23,310,209 bp
Band	7p15.3	End	23,470,491 bp

Gene location (Mouse)
Chr.	Chromosome 6 (mouse)
Band	6 B2.3|6 23.82 cM	Start	49,062,157 bp
Band	6 B2.3|6 23.82 cM	End	49,191,891 bp
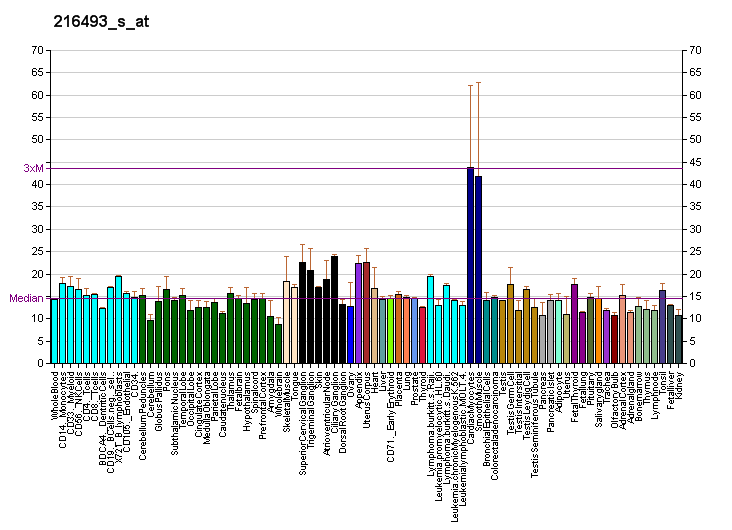

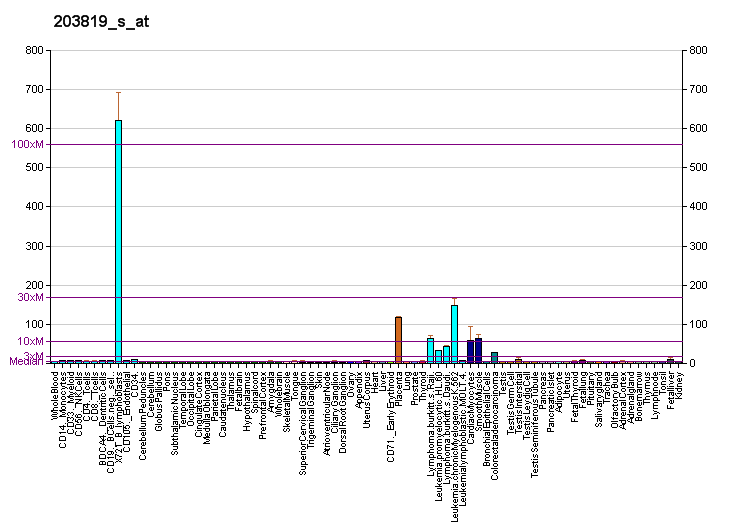

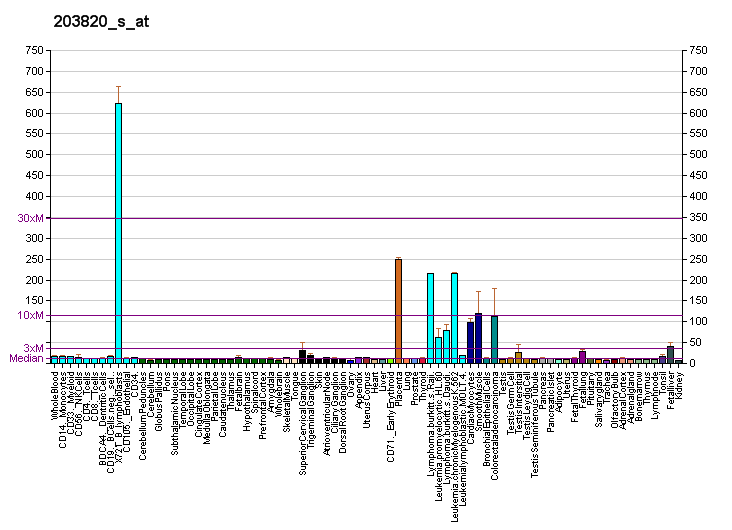
RNA expression pattern
Bgee	Human / Mouse (ortholog); Top expressed in: secondary oocyte; amniotic fluid; buccal mucosa cell; placenta; embryo; sperm; ventricular zone; ganglionic eminence; monocyte; cartilage tissue / Top expressed in: primitive streak; tail of embryo; mandibular prominence; maxillary prominence; genital tubercle; somite; internal carotid artery; medullary collecting duct; abdominal wall; epithelium of small intestine; More reference expression data
BioGPS	More reference expression data
Gene ontology
Molecular function	mRNA 5'-UTR binding; protein binding; translation regulator activity; mRNA 3'-UTR binding; nucleic acid binding; RNA binding
Cellular component	nucleus; cytoplasm; cytosol
Biological process	anatomical structure morphogenesis; negative regulation of translation; mRNA transport; protein biosynthesis; regulation of translation; regulation of mRNA stability; transport
Sources:Amigo / QuickGO
Orthologs
Databases	NCBI: entry; OMA: entry
Species	Human	Mouse
Entrez	10643	140488
Ensembl	ENSG00000136231	ENSMUSG00000029814
UniProt	O00425	Q9CPN8
RefSeq (mRNA)	NM_006547	NM_023670
RefSeq (protein)	NP_006538	NP_076159
Location (UCSC)	Chr 7: 23.31 – 23.47 Mb	Chr 6: 49.06 – 49.19 Mb
PubMed search
- Wikidata
View/Edit Human	View/Edit Mouse

Insulin-like growth factor 2 mRNA-binding protein 3 is a protein that in humans is encoded by the IGF2BP3 gene.

The protein encoded by this gene is primarily found in the nucleolus, where it can bind to the 5' UTR of the insulin-like growth factor II leader 3 mRNA and may repress translation of insulin-like growth factor II during late development.

The encoded protein contains several KH domains, which are important in RNA binding and are known to be involved in RNA synthesis and metabolism. A pseudogene exists on chromosome 7, and there are putative pseudogenes on other chromosomes.

== See also ==
- IGF2BP1
- IGF2BP2
