= CELF1 =

Protein-coding gene in humans

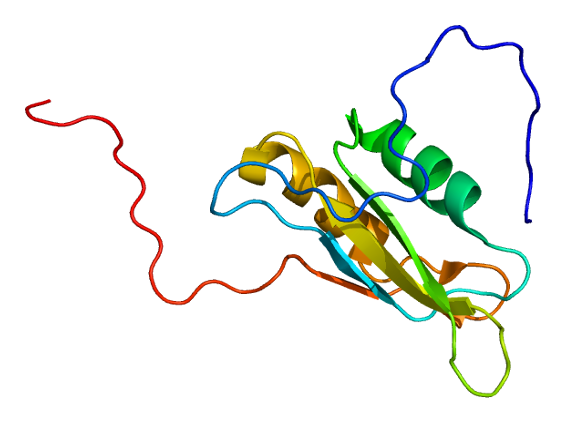

Identifiers
- Aliases: CELF1, BRUNOL2, CUG-BP, CUGBP, CUGBP1, EDEN-BP, NAB50, NAPOR, hNab50, CUGBP, Elav-like family member 1, CUGBP Elav-like family member 1
- External IDs: OMIM: 601074; MGI: 1342295; GeneCards: CELF1
Available structures
| PDB | Ortholog search: PDBe RCSB |
| PDB | List of PDB id codes 2CPZ, 2DHS, 2RQ4, 2RQC, 3NMR, 3NNA, 3NNC, 3NNH |

Gene location (Human)
| Chr. | Chromosome 11 (human) |
| Band | 11p11.2 | Start | 47,465,933 bp |
| Band | 11p11.2 | End | 47,565,569 bp |
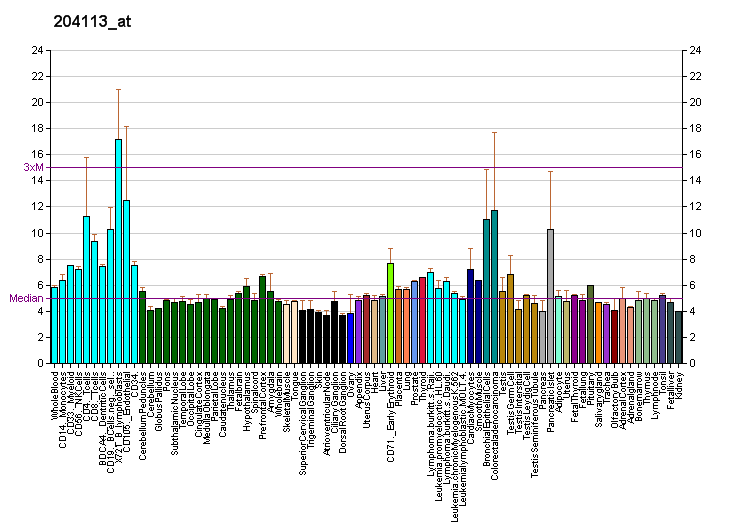

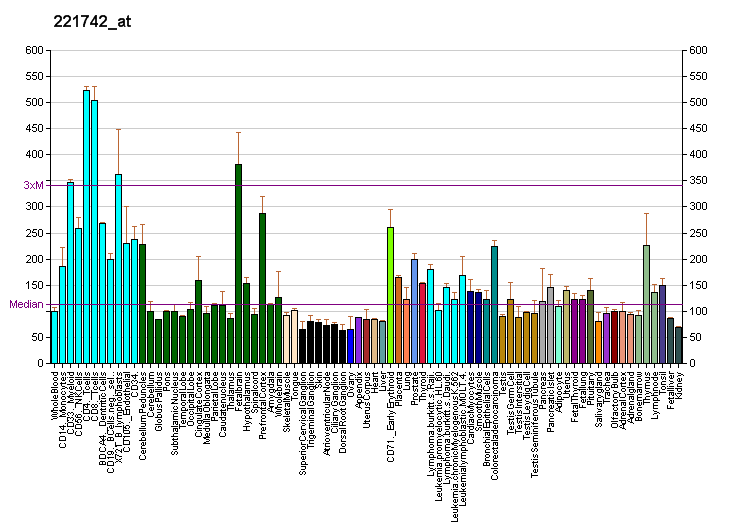

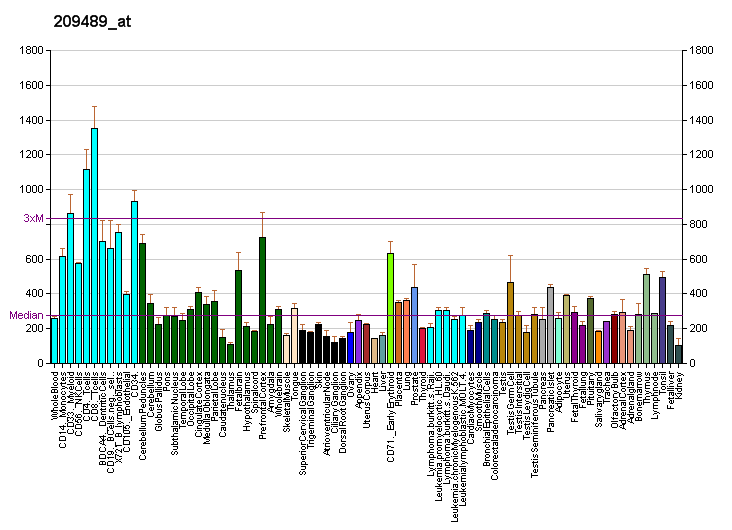
RNA expression pattern
| Bgee | Human / Mouse (ortholog); Top expressed in: secondary oocyte; tail of epididymis; caput epididymis; corpus epididymis; renal medulla; trabecular bone; pylorus; seminal vesicula; mucosa of paranasal sinus; bronchial epithelial cell / n/a; More reference expression data |
| BioGPS | More reference expression data |
Gene ontology
| Molecular function | translation repressor activity, mRNA regulatory element binding; protein binding; RNA binding; nucleic acid binding; BRE binding; mRNA binding; pre-mRNA binding |
| Cellular component | cytoplasm; membrane; nucleoplasm; nucleus; ribonucleoprotein complex |
| Biological process | germ cell development; embryo development; mRNA processing; RNA interference; regulation of RNA splicing; RNA splicing; negative regulation of translation; mRNA splice site selection; regulation of alternative mRNA splicing, via spliceosome; embryo development ending in birth or egg hatching |
Sources:Amigo / QuickGO
Orthologs
| Databases | NCBI: entry; OMA: entry |
| Species | Human | Mouse |
| Entrez | 10658 | 13046 |
| Ensembl | ENSG00000149187 | ENSMUSG00000005506 |
| UniProt | Q92879 | P28659 |
| RefSeq (mRNA) | NM_001025596; NM_001172639; NM_001172640; NM_006560; NM_198700 NM_001330272 | NM_001244891; NM_001244903; NM_017368; NM_198683 |
| RefSeq (protein) | NP_001020767; NP_001166110; NP_001166111; NP_001317201; NP_006551 NP_941989; NP_001363298; NP_001363299; NP_001363300; NP_001363301; NP_001363302; NP_001363303; NP_001363305; NP_001363306; NP_001363307; NP_001363308; NP_001363309; NP_001363310; NP_001363311; NP_001363312; NP_001363313; NP_001363314; NP_001363315; NP_001363316; NP_001363317; NP_001363318; NP_001363319; NP_001363320; NP_001363322; NP_001363324; NP_001363325; NP_001363326; NP_001363328; NP_001363335; NP_001363336; NP_001363337; NP_001363338; NP_001363339; NP_001363340; NP_001363341; NP_001363342; NP_001363343; NP_001363344; NP_001363346; NP_001363347; NP_001363348; NP_001363349; NP_001363350; NP_001363351; NP_001363352; NP_001363353; NP_001363354; NP_001363355; NP_001363356; NP_001363357; NP_001363358; NP_001363359; NP_001363360; NP_001363361; NP_001363362; NP_001363363; NP_001363364; NP_001363365; NP_001363366; NP_001363367; NP_001363368; NP_001363369; NP_001363370; NP_001363371; NP_001363372; NP_001363373; NP_001363374; NP_001363375; NP_001363376; NP_001363377; NP_001363378; NP_001363379; NP_001363380; NP_001363381; NP_001363382; NP_001363383; NP_001363384; NP_001363385; NP_001363386; NP_001363387; NP_001363388; NP_001363389; NP_001363390; NP_001363391; NP_001363392; NP_001363304 | NP_001231820; NP_001231832; NP_059064; NP_941955; NP_001393093 NP_001393094; NP_001393095; NP_001393096; NP_001393097; NP_001393098; NP_001393099; NP_001393100; NP_001393101; NP_001393102; NP_001393103; NP_001393104; NP_001393105; NP_001393106; NP_001393107; NP_001393108; NP_001393109; NP_001393110; NP_001393111; NP_001393112; NP_001393113 |
| Location (UCSC) | Chr 11: 47.47 – 47.57 Mb | n/a |
| PubMed search |
- Wikidata
| View/Edit Human | View/Edit Mouse |

CUGBP Elav-like family member 1 is a protein which in humans is encoded by the CELF1 gene (previously CUGBP1).

== Function ==
Members of the CELF/BRUNOL protein family contain two N-terminal RNA recognition motif (RRM) domains, one C-terminal RRM domain, and a divergent segment of 160-230 aa between the second and third RRM domains. Members of this protein family regulate pre-mRNA alternative splicing and may also be involved in mRNA editing, and translation. This gene may play a role in myotonic dystrophy type 1 (DM1) via interactions with the dystrophia myotonica-protein kinase (DMPK) gene. Alternative splicing results in multiple transcript variants encoding different isoforms.

== mRNA degradation factor ==
It is estimated that 5 to 8% of human mRNAs are unstable because of mRNA instability elements in their 3' untranslated regions (3'UTR). A number of such elements have been called AU-rich elements (AREs). It is now known that AREs are binding sites for RNA-binding proteins that target mRNAs to rapid degradation. However, only few of the proteins reported to bind AREs were demonstrated to play a role in mRNA degradation. A shared feature of these proteins is to bind only to a subclass of the known AREs that contain the pentamer AUUUA. A convergent effort of several research teams now adds CUGBP1 (CUG binding protein 1) to the short list of ARE-Binding proteins that control mRNA stability, with the peculiarity that it binds to non-AUUUA AREs. CUGBP1 has been involved both as a key regulator of human myotonic dystrophy 1 (DM1) and more recently as a regulator of human papilloma virus mRNA expression.

Evidence for CUGBP1 acting as a RNA degradation factor came first from the Xenopus model. Xenopus CUGBP1 (xCUGBP1, formerly known as EDEN-BP) was identified in 1998 for its ability to bind specifically to a GU-rich element (Embryonic deadenylation element EDEN) located in the 3'UTRs of some mRNAs that are rapidly deadenylated and translationally repressed after fertilization in early development. Because deadenylation is often the rate limiting step of mRNA degradation the enhancement of deadenylation increases mRNA turnover.

Human CUGBP1 (hCUGBP1) had been previously identified by Timchenko and colleagues for its ability to bind to CUG repeats located in the DMPK 3'UTR. A large amount of work has since described the role of hCUGBP1 on control of alternative splicing and will not be discussed here. The demonstration that hCUGBP1 is involved in the control of mRNA deadenylation and instability like xCUGBP1 came next. In mammalian cell extract as well as in xenopus egg extracts, depletion and rescue experiments showed that specific binding of CUGBP1 to the 3'UTR of mRNA is required for the targeted specific deadenylation to occur. In rescue experiments in xenopus egg extracts, the recombinant human protein can replace the xenopus one making them functional homolog. Furthermore, the Poly(A) ribonuclease PARN was shown to interact with CUGBP1. In human cells, tethering of hCUGBP1 to a mRNA decreases its steadystate suggesting the destabilization of the mRNA. The first human mRNA reported to be targeted to rapid deadenylation and degradation by CUGBP1 is the oncogene c-jun. Years ago, it was shown that the class III ARE (devoid of any AUUUA motif) of the human c-jun oncogene directed rapid deadenylation and degradation to a reporter mRNA. Both xCUGBP1 and hCUGBP1 were shown to specifically bind to c-jun ARE. The binding of CUGBP1 to the 3'UTR of mRNAs bearing GU-rich element would target these mRNAs for rapid deadenylation by PARN and subsequent degradation. This was recently demonstrated by siRNA-mediated knockdown of hCUGBP1 that led to stabilization of a reporter RNA bearing the c-jun UG -rich ARE.

UGU(G/A) tetranucleotides are key determinants of the binding site for xCUGBP1. A SELEX approach for the identification of artificial substrate of hCUGBP1 led to the proposition that UGU containing sequences were highly favoured for binding. More recently, the reappraisal of CUGBP1 binding sites on the base of a combination of the SELEX approach and

Immunoprecipitation of the CUGBP1 containing complexes has led Graindorge et al. to propose a 15 nt motif as a key determinant of CUGBP1 binding. Such a motif is found in a number of unstable mRNAs in human cells suggesting that they are degraded by a CUGBP1 deadenylation dependent pathway.
