= WDR88 =

Human gene

Identifiers
- Aliases: WDR88, PQWD, WD repeat domain 88
- External IDs: MGI: 2686275; GeneCards: WDR88

Gene location (Human)
Chr.	Chromosome 19 (human)
Band	19q13.11	Start	33,132,090 bp
Band	19q13.11	End	33,175,799 bp

Gene location (Mouse)
Chr.	Chromosome 7 (mouse)
Band	7|7 B2	Start	34,938,216 bp
Band	7|7 B2	End	34,974,958 bp
RNA expression pattern
Bgee	Human / Mouse (ortholog); Top expressed in: testicle; sperm; left testis; right testis; prefrontal cortex; smooth muscle tissue; right uterine tube; islet of Langerhans; appendix; monocyte / Top expressed in: spermatid; spermatocyte; morula; testicle; embryo; More reference expression data
BioGPS	n/a
Orthologs
Databases	NCBI: entry; OMA: entry
Species	Human	Mouse
Entrez	126248	384605
Ensembl	ENSG00000166359	ENSMUSG00000118454
UniProt	Q6ZMY6	n/a
RefSeq (mRNA)	NM_173479	NM_001370886
RefSeq (protein)	NP_775750	n/a
Location (UCSC)	Chr 19: 33.13 – 33.18 Mb	Chr 7: 34.94 – 34.97 Mb
PubMed search
- Wikidata
View/Edit Human	View/Edit Mouse

WDR88 (WD repeat containing protein 88) is a protein, which in humans, is encoded by the gene WDR88. It consists of seven WD40 repeats, which form a seven-bladed beta-propeller. Mutations within the WDR88 gene are associated with a variety of cancers, as well as schizophrenia and fungal infections.

The protein structure of WDR88 is characterized by the presence of seven WD40 repeats, which are short structural motifs of approximately 40 amino acids that often terminate in a tryptophan-aspartic acid (WD) dipeptide. These repeats typically form a beta-propeller structure, suggesting a potential role in protein-protein interactions.

== Gene ==
WDR88 gene on human chromosome 19

The WDR88 gene is on chromosome 19 at position 19q13.11 on the plus strand. The gene is encoded from position 33,132,114 to 33,175,799. It has 11 exons, and is approximately 1702 base pairs long. Other genes in the gene neighborhood include: RHPN2 (rhophilin rho GTPase binding protein 2), LRP3 (low density lipoprotein receptor-related protein 3), SLC7A10 (solute carrier family 7 membrane 10), and GPATCH1 (G-patch domain containing 1). The WDR88 gene may also be referred to as PQWD (PQQ repeat containing and WD repeat containing gene).

== Transcripts ==
The gene WDR88 has 3 isoforms. The splice variants of the WDR88 transcript vary according to their first and last exon and their last two introns. This isoform (aAug10) has an mRNA sequence of 1702 nucleotides.

Comparison of the 3 WDR88 isoforms
mRNA Variant	Gene Length	Protein Length	5' UTR	3' UTR
aAug10	1702	472	56	227
bAug10	1835	426	78	476
cAug10-unspliced	561	121	-	195

=== Tissue Expression ===
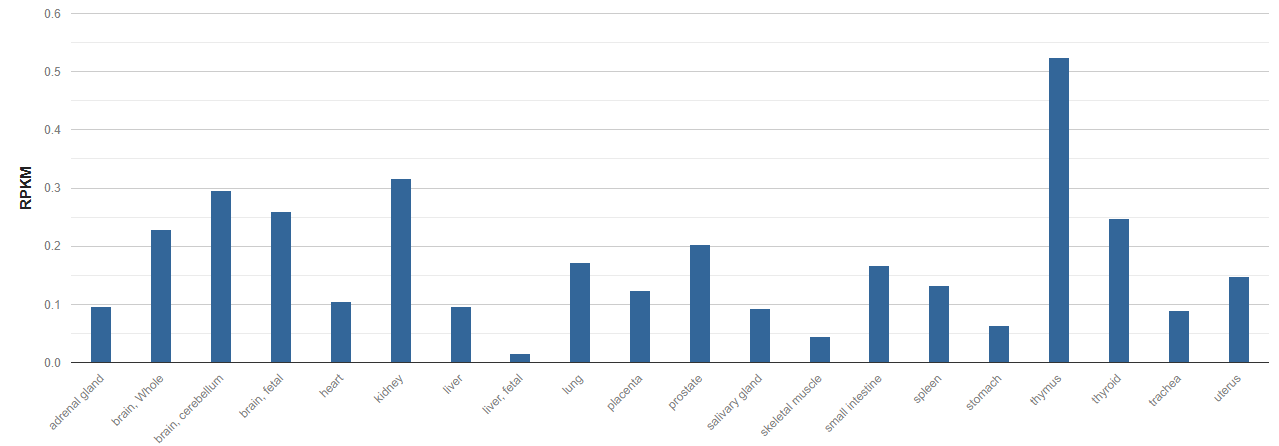
WDR88 RNA expression in 20 human tissues. WDR88 is abundance is relevant in thymus, prostate, and salivary gland.

WDR88 RNA is expressed lowly and ubiquitously in most tissue types. It is expressed in slightly higher levels in the prostate, thyroid, thymus, and salivary gland. Its presence in these tissues may relate to associated diseases- WDR88 has been associated with prostate cancer, as well as an increased susceptibility of Candidiasis (which may also be associated with cancer of the salivary gland). Thymus cell dysfunction may also lead to cancer (including prostate cancer).

Other tissues with moderate expression include the heart, skeletal muscle, brain, kidney, lymph nodes, and ovaries.

== Protein ==
The WDR88 protein is a nuclear protein. The protein is 472 amino acids long and has a calculated molecular weight of 53kDa. Its isoelectric point is approximately a pH of 7.0. In addition, there is an increased abundance of cysteine, aspartic acid, and serine residues. Its increased abundance of serine may contribute to its ability to be hyperphosphorylated. Human WDR88 displays a somewhat similar and isoelectric point to selected orthologs.

Molecular Characteristics by Species
Species Type	Common name	Scientific name	Molecular Weight (kDa)	Isoelectric Point
Mammals	Human	Homo sapiens	53	7.0
Mammals	Koala	Phascolarctos cinereus	48	6.3
Mammals	Large flying fox bat	Pteropus vampyrus	55	6.7
Mammals	Small madagascar hedgehog	Echinops telfairi	54	8.9
Mammals	Australian echidna	Tachyglossus aculeatus	47	8.2
Mammals	Cattle	Bos taurus	63	6.7
Birds	South African ostrich	Struthio camelus australis	44	7.2
Birds	Barn owl	Tyto alba	44	5.9
Birds	Emperor penguin	Aptenodytes forsteri	52	6.5
Reptiles	Chinese soft shelled turtle	Pelodiscus sinensis	46	5.9
Reptiles	Australian saltwater crocodile	Crocodylus porosus	45	6.0
Reptiles	Komodo Dragon	Varanus komodoensis	44	6.1
Reptiles	European leaf toed gecko	Euleptes europaea	48	8.9
Reptiles	Tiger rattlesnake	Crotalus tigris	44	5.7
Amphibians	Common frog	Rana temporaria	44	6.1
Amphibians	Common toad	Bufo bufo	44	6.9
Amphibians	Two-lined caecilian	Rhinatrema bivittatum	75	6.0
Fish	W. African Lungfish	Protopterus annectens	44	5.6
Fish	Thorny Skate	Amblyraja radiata	44	5.6
Fish	Sea Lamprey	Petromyzon marinus	47	9.0

=== Secondary Structure ===
The 5' untranslated region is 56 base pairs long, and the 3' untranslated region is 227 base pairs in length, spanning from base 1475 to 1702. The 5' UTR is predicted to have 1 stem loop, while the 3' UTR can have as many as 4 stem loops, although its most stable structure has 2 stem loops.

=== Tertiary Structure ===
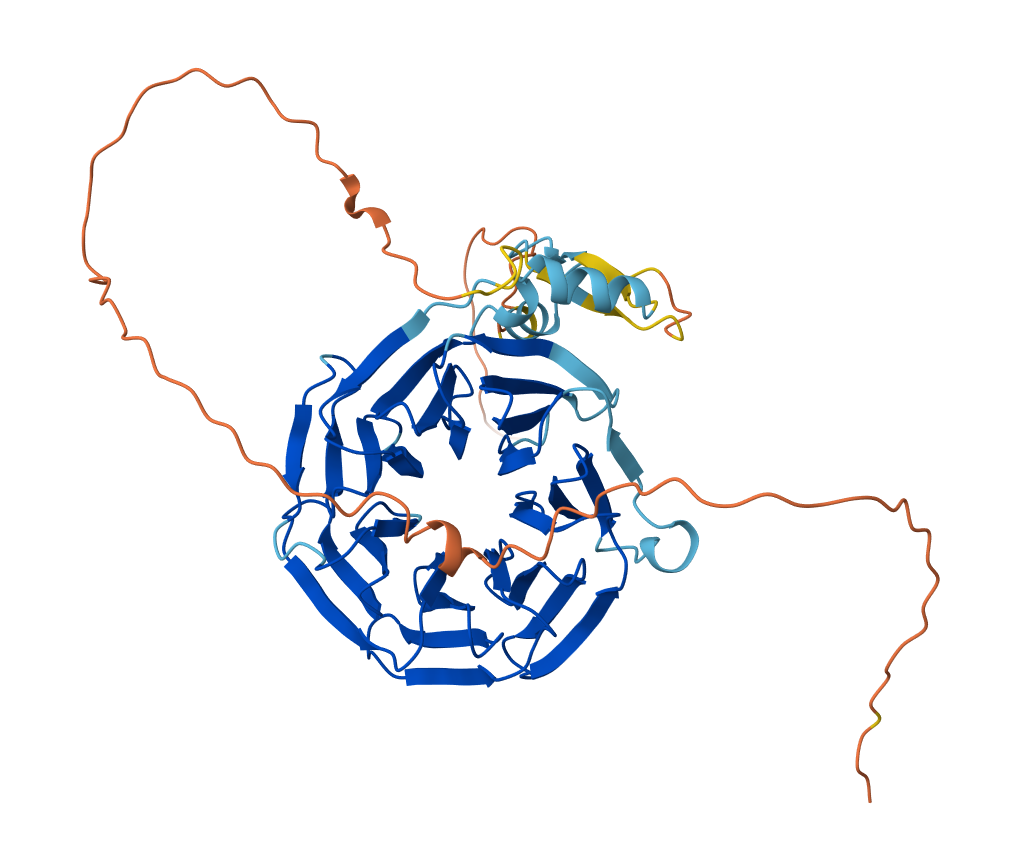
Predicted structure of human WDR88 protein.

The WDR88 protein has 7 WD40 repeats each of which form an antiparallel blade, all together forming a beta propeller. The presence of a 7-bladed beta propeller is generally conserved in orthologs from mammals to fish.

== Transcript Level Regulation ==
=== Transcription Factors ===
Notable transcription factors include: Nr1h::Rxra, EBF1, and PLAG1. ZNFs (zinc finger proteins) and SOX (SRY-related HMG box) transcription factors are common.

Nr1h3::Rxra (Liver X receptor alpha, retinoid receptor X alpha) play a role in lipid metabolism, inflammation, and cholesterol homeostasis. Dysregulation of these processes are implicated in prostate cancer progression. Decreased expression of this factor means pro-inflammatory gene expression can increase, leading to inflammation (a risk factor for prostate cancer). This factor can also interfere with androgen receptor pathways, which may influence androgen-dependent prostate cancer cell growth.

EBF1 (Early B-cell factor 1) may contribute to the development of schizophrenia through its role in neurodevelopment and immune system function. Specifically, EBF1 can work with microRNAs to create regulatory loops to influence the onset and progression of schizophrenia.

PLAG1 (Pleomorphic adenoma gene 1) is associated with pleomorphic adenomas of the salivary gland. Chromosomal translocations of the target sequence can over-activate PLAG1, leading to an overactivation of downstream factors/targets that are involved in cell proliferation, leading to cancerous growths. Cancer of the salivary gland can lead to dry mouth, which is a risk factor of Candidiasis (thrush) and other oral fungal infections.

=== microRNA ===
microRNA (miRNA) binding sites are only found within the 3' untranslated region. Notably, the miRNA hsa-miR-191-5p is associated with various types of cancer due to its ability to act as an oncogene by promoting cell differentiation & migration

=== Binding Proteins ===
RNA binding protein binding regions are found within the 5' and 3' untranslated regions. Notable examples within the 5' region include ELF4B (E74-like factor 4B) and RBMX proteins. RBMX specifically has the ability to repair DNA damage, and can suppress tumorigenicity/progression of bladder cancer. ELF4B is important in cell growth and differentiation, and dysregulation in this interaction could lead to cancer<.

The 3' UTR binding proteins include IGF2BP1 (Insulin-like Growth Factor 2 MRNA Binding Protein 1), PTBP1 (Polypyrimidine Tract Binding Protein 1), RBMX proteins, and KHSRP (KH-Type Splicing Regulatory Protein).

IGF2BP1 is known to regulate mRNA stability, splicing, and translation. In the context of cancer, IGF2BP1 may impact tumor progression and metastasis by stabilizing oncogenic mRNAs and promoting cell proliferation.

PTBP1 (Polypyrimidine Tract Binding Protein 1) is known for its role in splicing regulation. It may also influence the stability and translation of cancer-related transcripts, potentially contributing to cancer development.

KHSRP (KH-Type Splicing Regulatory Protein) is involved in the regulation of mRNA processing, including splicing and decay. It has been implicated in the regulation of various cancer-related genes and may play a role in cancer progression.

== Protein Level Regulation ==
=== Post Translational Modifications ===
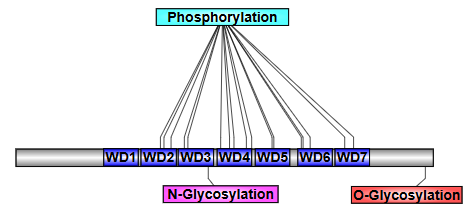
Sites of likely post translational modifications. Phosphorylation sites were moderately to highly conserved among orthologs. Made with BioCuckoo Illustrator for Biological Sequences.

The WDR88 protein is predicted to be hyperphosphorylated, with an additional acetylation site and ubiquitination site. The presence of multiple phosphorylation sites is conserved among orthologs. The WDR88 protein may also have N- and O-glycosylation sites

.

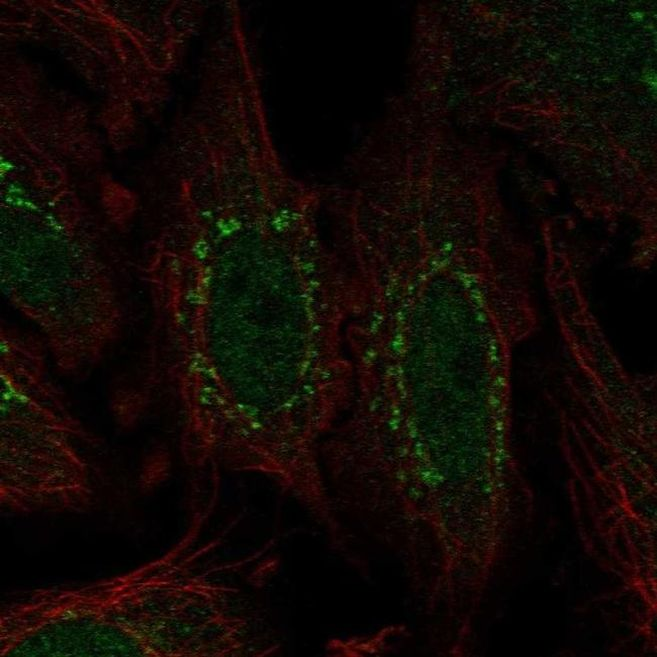
Immunofluorescent staining of human WDR88, showing localization in nucleoplasm (green) and Golgi body (red). Image courtesy of ThermoFisher<.

=== Subcellular Location ===
The WDR88 protein is primarily located within the nucleus, with its location being conserved in orthologs.

== Evolution ==
=== Paralogs ===
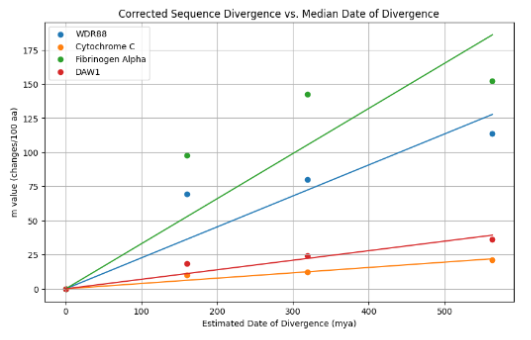
Corrected sequence divergence vs. median date of divergence of human WDR88, cytochrome c, fibrinogen alpha, and DAW1.

WDR88 paralogs include WDR5 (WD repeat containing protein 5), APAF1 (Apoptotic protease activating factor 1), WDR38, PAF1 (Protease activating factor 1), and DAW1 (dynein assembly factor with WD repeats 1).

=== Orthologs ===
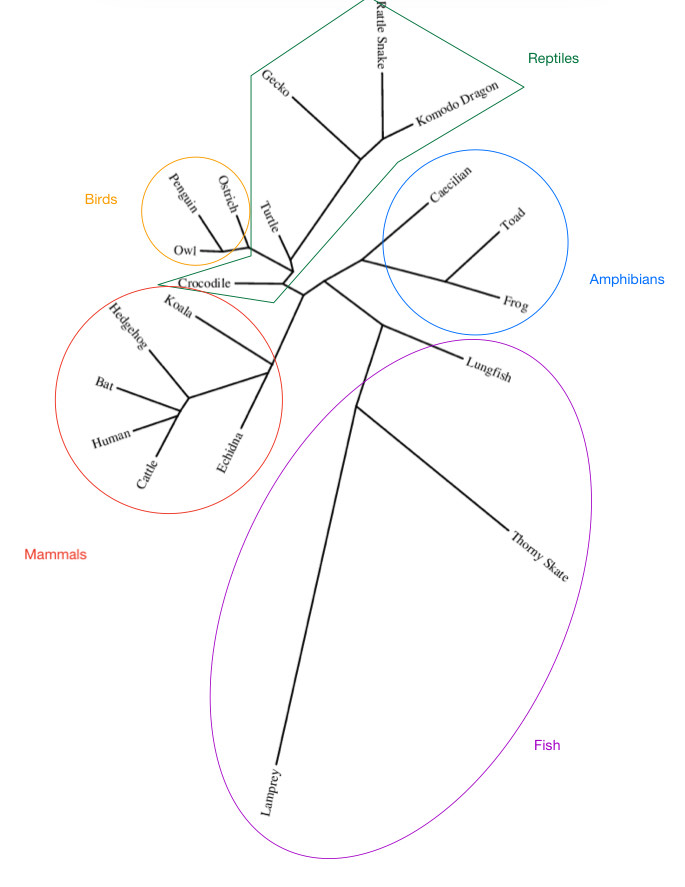
Phylogenetic tree of WDR88 in20 vertebrate orthologs. Made with the assistance of phylogeny.fr.

WDR88 in Homo sapiens is highly conserved. Its found in many vertebrate organisms, including other mammals, birds, reptiles, amphibians, and fish. It has not been identified in invertebrates. Table 2 shows a selection of orthologs in mammals, birds, reptiles, amphibians, and fish. Many conserved regions fell within the WD repeat domain, and most WD dipeptides were conserved among close and distant orthologs.

==== WDR88 Protein Alignment Gallery ====
Multiple Sequence Alignment of WDR88 protein among humans and 20 orthologs. Exon boundaries are shown in black, WD domains in orange brackets, and WD40 repeats in gray highlighting.

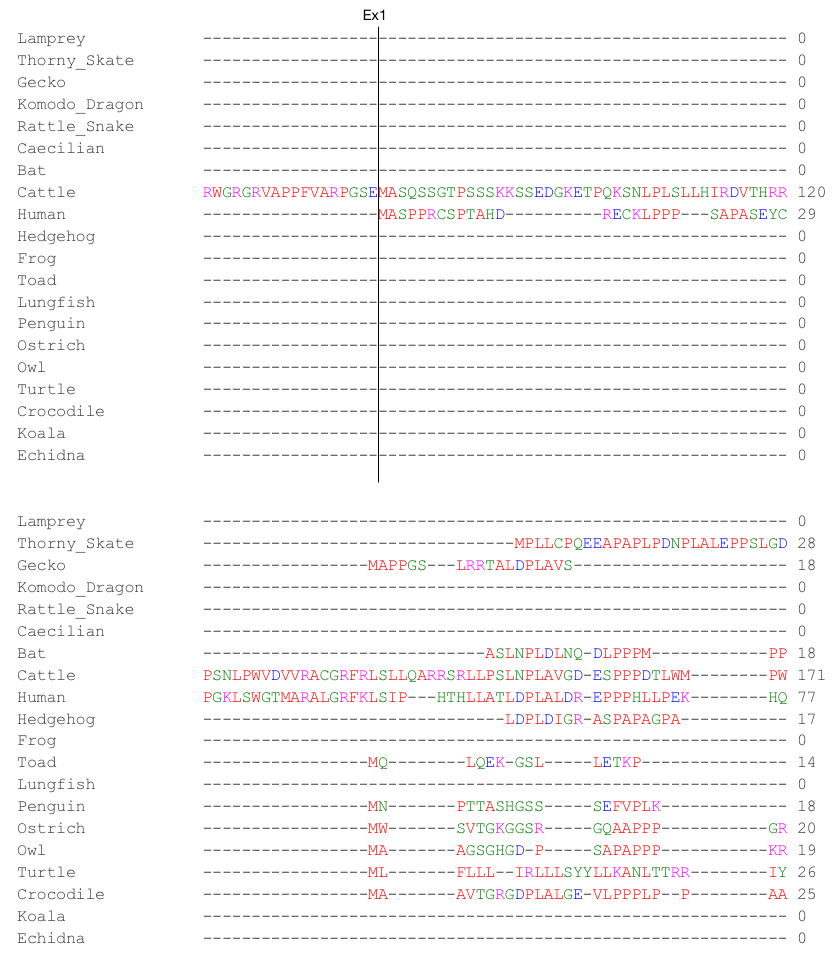
Part 1

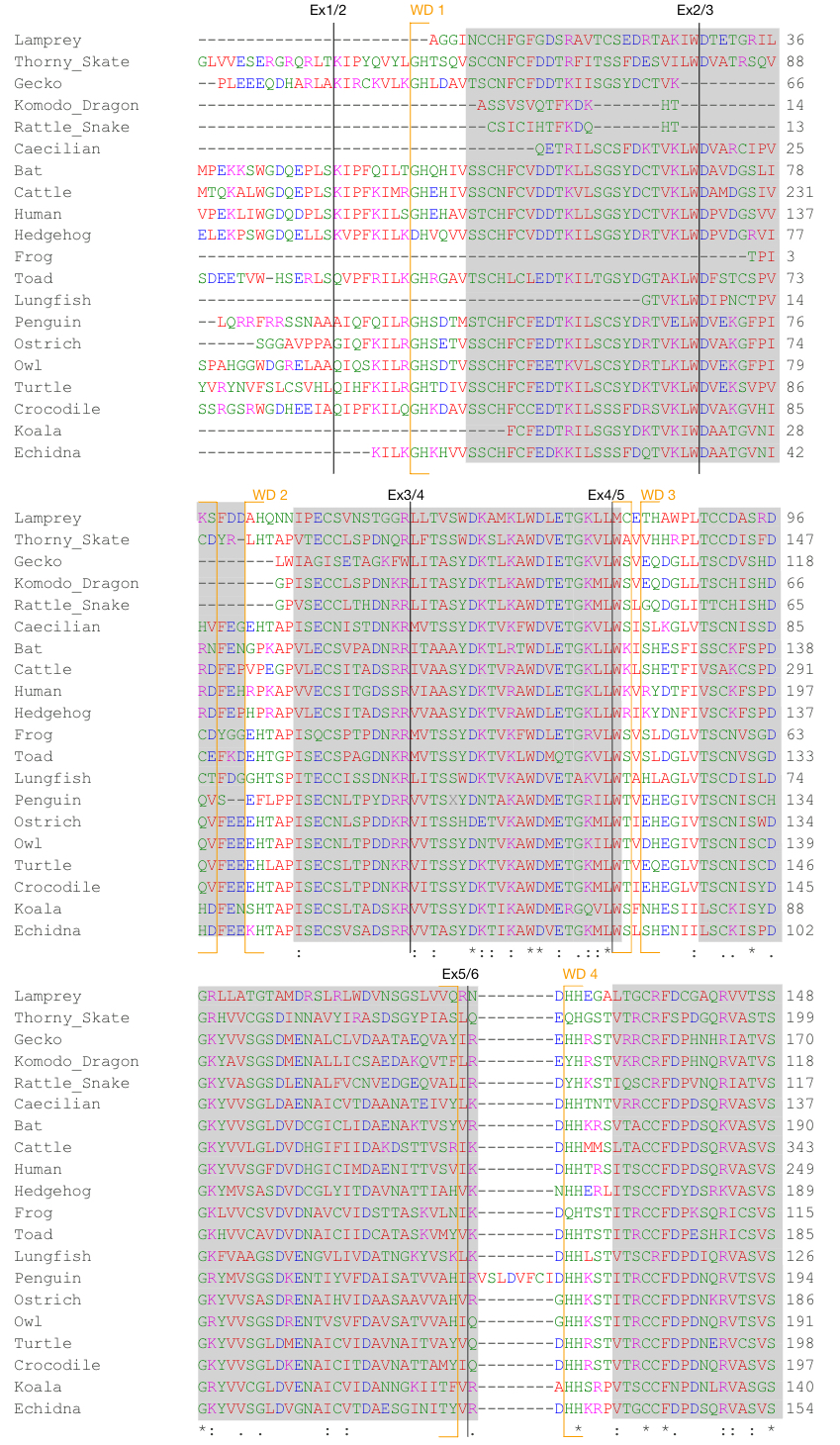
Part 2

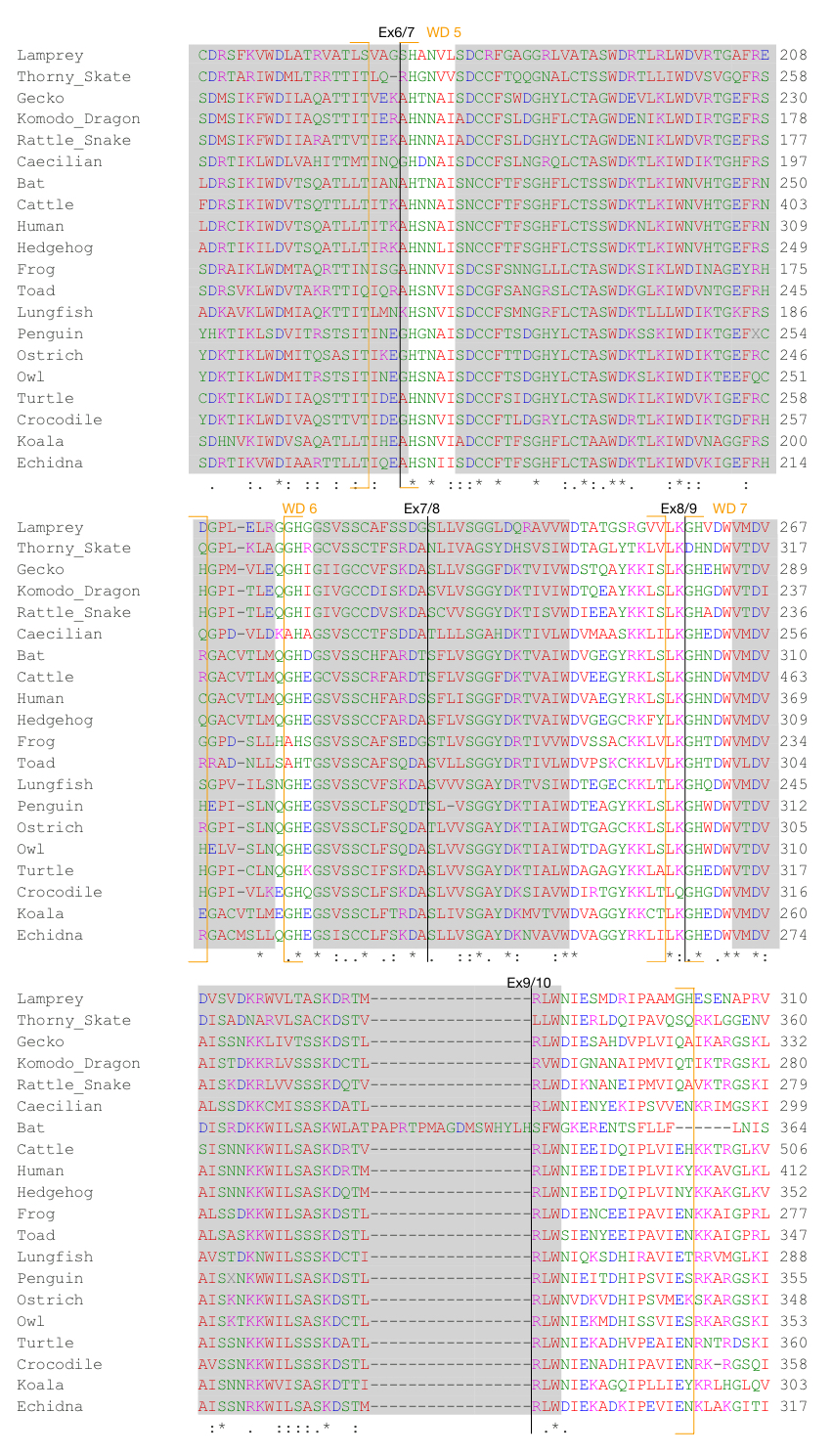
Part 3

=== Phylogeny & History ===
The WDR88 gene is evolving relatively quickly compared to cytochrome c and DAW1, but slower than the rate of fibrinogen alpha.

== Interacting Proteins ==
Human WDR88 protein has notable interactions with the following proteins which are all associated with cell cycle regulation: KIA1429, FOS family proteins, NUDC, and WDR31. These interactions implicate human WDR88 in cell regulation processes.

WDR88 is also associated with argG (citrate-aspartate ligase), metE (cobalamin-independent methionine synthase), GATM (glycine amidinotransferase), and TYR (tyrosinase), which are in arginine, methionine, creatinine, and melanin synthesis (respectively).

WDR88 can also interact with proteins associated with the bacterium Yersinia pestis, which causes plague.

== Clinical Significance ==
In uterine & endometrial carcinoma, the WDR88 gene may serve as a relevant biomarker, and could also be a potential therapeutic target. In prostate cancer, WDR88 can function as a marker for onset

There is a significant association between a WDR88 gene variant and increased susceptibility to Candidiasis, an oral fungal infection. A single nucleotide polymorphism at position 1328 changes from a cytosine to a thymine, causing an isoleucine to mutation to an alanine at position 424.

Exome array data showed 7 rare WDR88 variants contribute to the "genetic architecture of schizophrenia". 2 of these variants are predicted to be damaging or possibly damaging.

Coding Sequence Mutations
Type	Position	Base Change	Amino Acid Change	Associations	rsID	Label
Missense	103	365A-->G	H-->Q	Schizophrenia	exm1453333	VarA
Missense	166	496G-->A	D-->N		1483589630	
Missense	172	514T-->C	W-->R		1973547431	VarB
Missense	173	517G-->C	D-->H		2145383159	
Missense	195	583T-->G	S-->A		964934511	
Missense	198	593G-->A	G-->D		1973572567	
Missense	229	687C-->A, 687C-->T	H-->Q, =		1390996134	
Missense	236	707G-->A	C-->Y		1973627073	VarC
Missense	238	712T-->C	F-->L		1315930267	
Missense	258	772G-->C	D-->V		1350318862	
Missense	285	854G-->A	G-->D		1973735806	
Nonsense (stop gain)	293	878G-->A, 879G-->A	W-->Ter		766698986, 1454699628	VarD/E
Missense	300	898T-->C	W-->R		1973736716	
Nonsense (stop gain)	300	900G-->A	W-->Ter		1973736779	VarF
Missense	320	958C-->G, 958C-->T	H-->D, Y		571091956	
Missense	322	964G-->A	G-->S		938493076	VarG
Missense	327	979T-->C, 979T-->G	C-->R, G		916309262	
Missense	332	995A-->G	D-->G		1973739195	
Missense	339	1016G-->A	G-->R, E		753069912, 138717522	
Missense	342	1024G-->C	D-->H		1973845950	
Missense	348	1043G-->T	W-->L		200178208	
Missense	362	1085A-->G	H-->R		1213339071	
Missense	368	1103A-->G	D-->R		1973916950	VarH
Missense	372	1115G-->T	S-->I		11668547	
Missense	378	1188C-->T	I-->F	Schizophrenia	exm1453382	VarI
Missense	383	1148A-->G	K-->R		768741120	
Missense	386	1156A-->C	T-->P		751290834	VarJ
Missense	390	1168T-->C, 1168T-->G	W-->R, G		1291251743	
Missense	424	1328C>T	I-->A, G	Candidiasis	rs10422015	
Missense	437	1311C-->G, 1311C-->T	C-->W, =		760463708	
Nonsense (stop lost)	473	1417T-->C, G	Ter-->R, G		760940871	VarK
Nonsense (stop lost)	473	1419A-->G	Ter -->W		146733199	VarL

== Gallery ==
Conceptual translation of human WDR88 protein, isoform 1, with key of variants.

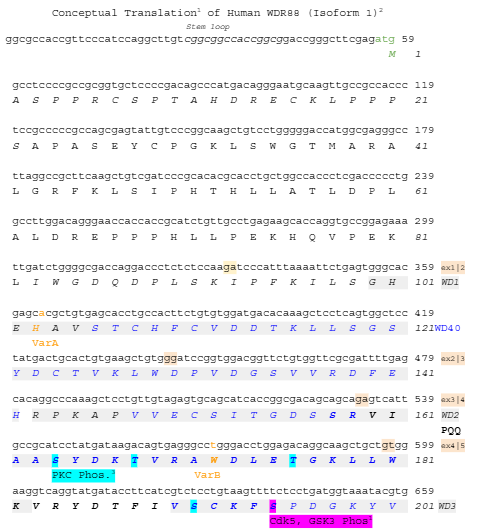
Part 1 of 3

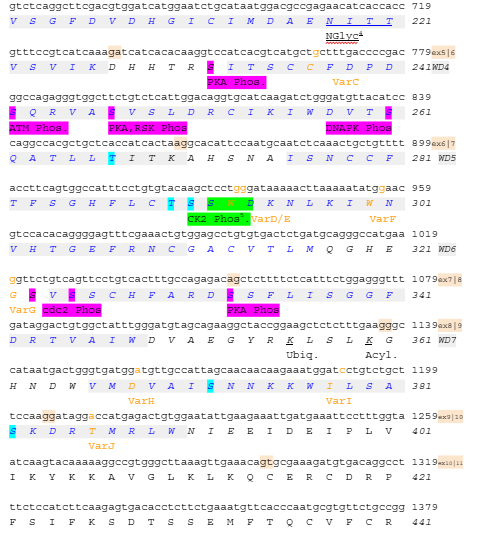
Part 2 of 3

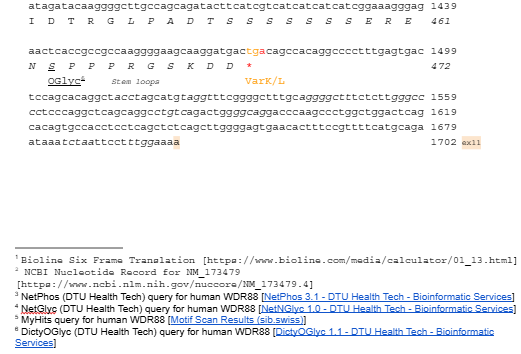
Part 3 of 3

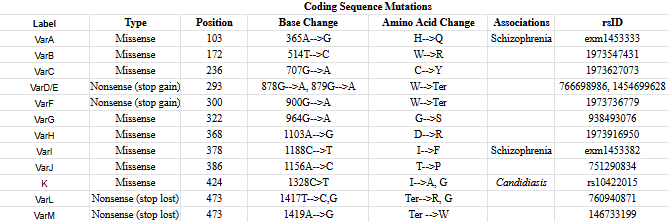
Variant Key
