= PTB2 RNA motif =

The PTB2 RNA motif is a conserved intronic RNA element identified in plant homologs of the polypyrimidine tract-binding protein 2 (PTB2) gene that has been reported as a cis-regulatory element.

== Structure ==
PTB2 is an RNA motif reported as a stem-loop structure, with the loop containing a conserved GUGUGU sequence that encompasses the 5′ splice site of a cassette exon involved in alternative splicing. The 3' side of the stem contains a long conserved pyrimidine-rich tract.

== Distribution ==
The PTB2 RNA motif was identified in homologous of 93 species of Pentapetalae plants.

== Function ==
The long conserved pyrimidine-rich tract located on the 3′ side of the PTB2 RNA motif stem suggests a role in regulation of PTB2 genes. The co-occurrence of the PTB2 RNA motif and PTB2 genes is consistent with a mechanistic link between RNA secondary structure and PTB-mediated splicing regulation. The motif has been proposed to contribute to regulation of PTB2 expression by influencing PTB1/PTB2 binding and promoting cassette exon inclusion during alternative splicing, which can lead to nonsense-mediated decay of the resulting transcript.
