= PCBP2 =

Protein-coding gene in the species Homo sapiens

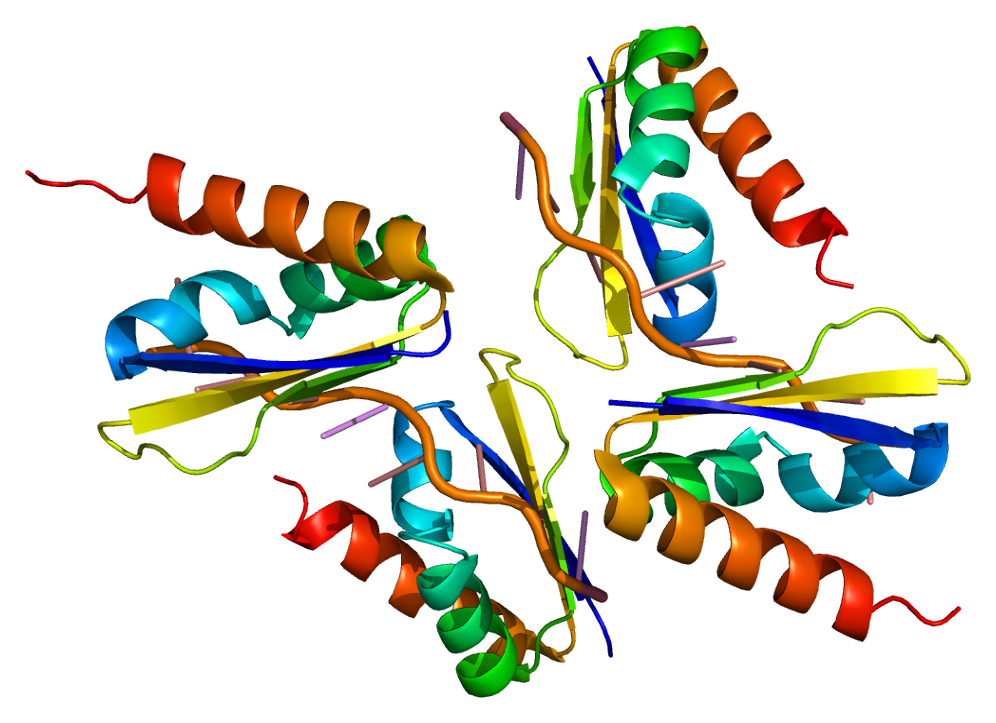

Identifiers
- Aliases: PCBP2, HNRNPE2, HNRPE2, hnRNP-E2, poly(rC) binding protein 2
- External IDs: OMIM: 601210; MGI: 108202; GeneCards: PCBP2
Available structures
PDB	Ortholog search: PDBe RCSB
PDB	List of PDB id codes 2AXY, 2JZX, 2P2R, 2PQU, 2PY9

Gene location (Human)
Chr.	Chromosome 12 (human)
Band	12q13.13	Start	53,452,102 bp
Band	12q13.13	End	53,481,162 bp

Gene location (Mouse)
Chr.	Chromosome 15 (mouse)
Band	15 F3|15 57.61 cM	Start	102,470,539 bp
Band	15 F3|15 57.61 cM	End	102,500,061 bp
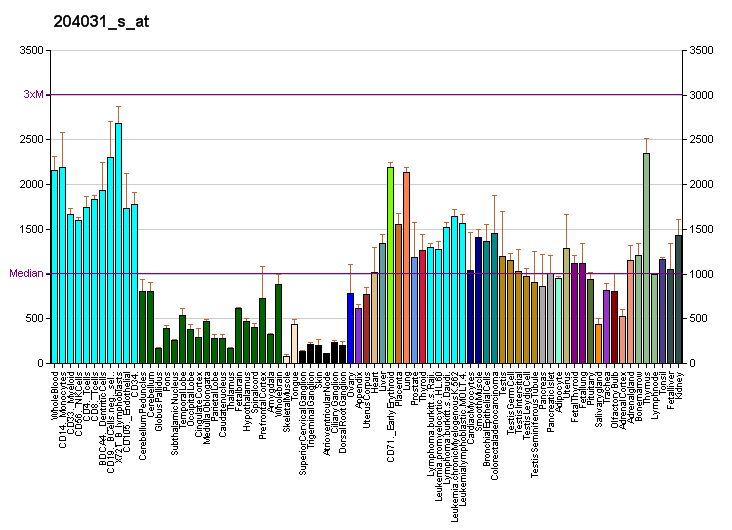

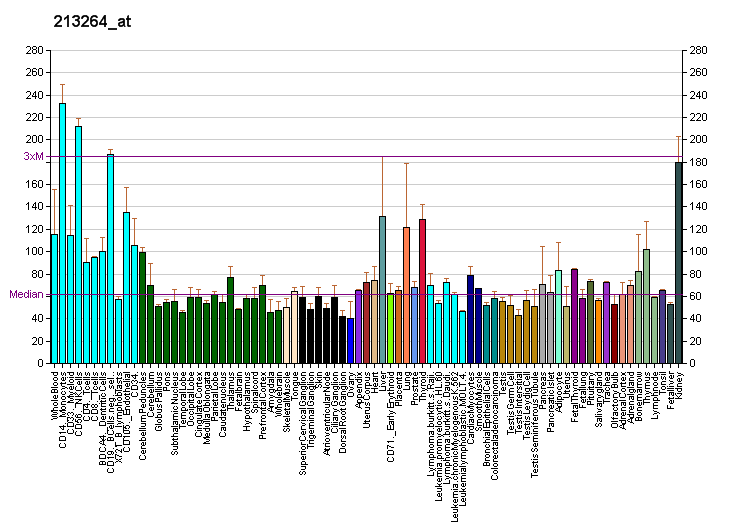

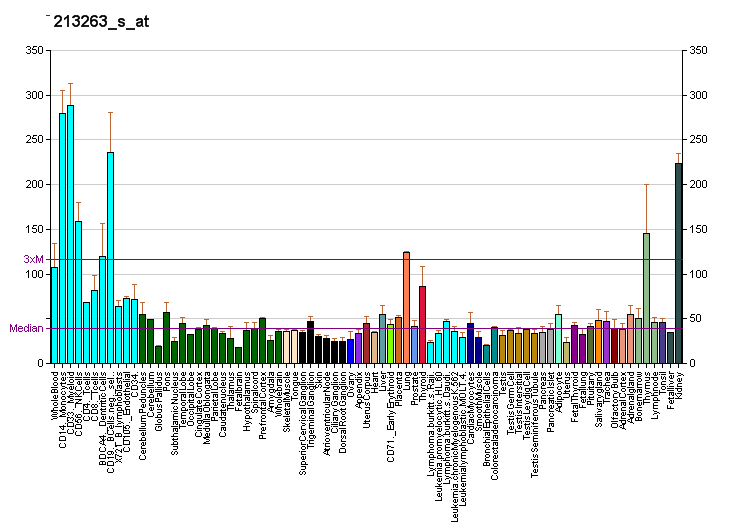
RNA expression pattern
Bgee	Human / Mouse (ortholog); Top expressed in: ganglionic eminence; ventricular zone; stromal cell of endometrium; left testis; right testis; left ovary; right adrenal cortex; left lobe of thyroid gland; right lobe of thyroid gland; right ovary / Top expressed in: neural layer of retina; epiblast; hand; ventricular zone; somite; molar; thymus; abdominal wall; tail of embryo; endocardial cushion; More reference expression data
BioGPS	More reference expression data
Gene ontology
Molecular function	DNA binding; enzyme binding; nucleic acid binding; ubiquitin protein ligase binding; protein binding; RNA binding; C-rich single-stranded DNA binding
Cellular component	extracellular exosome; membrane; focal adhesion; nucleoplasm; cytoplasm; nucleus; cytosol; postsynaptic density
Biological process	mRNA splicing, via spliceosome; negative regulation of defense response to virus; proteasome-mediated ubiquitin-dependent protein catabolic process; defense response to virus; mRNA metabolic process; negative regulation of type I interferon production; immune system process; innate immune response; viral RNA genome replication; IRES-dependent viral translational initiation; RNA metabolic process
Sources:Amigo / QuickGO
Orthologs
Databases	NCBI: entry; OMA: entry
Species	Human	Mouse
Entrez	5094	18521
Ensembl	ENSG00000197111	ENSMUSG00000056851
UniProt	Q15366	Q61990
RefSeq (mRNA)	NM_031989; NM_001098620; NM_001128911; NM_001128912; NM_001128913 NM_001128914; NM_005016	NM_001103165; NM_001103166; NM_001174073; NM_011042
RefSeq (protein)	NP_001092090; NP_001122383; NP_001122384; NP_001122385; NP_001122386 NP_005007; NP_114366	NP_001096635; NP_001096636; NP_001167544; NP_035172; NP_001361700
Location (UCSC)	Chr 12: 53.45 – 53.48 Mb	Chr 15: 102.47 – 102.5 Mb
PubMed search
- Wikidata
View/Edit Human	View/Edit Mouse

Poly(rC)-binding protein 2 is a protein that in humans is encoded by the PCBP2 gene.

== Function ==
The protein encoded by this gene appears to be multifunctional. It along with PCBP-1 and hnRNPK corresponds to the major cellular poly(rC)-binding proteins. It contains three K-homologous (KH) domains which may be involved in RNA binding. This encoded protein together with PCBP-1 also functions as translational coactivators of poliovirus RNA via a sequence-specific interaction with stem-loop IV of the IRES and promote poliovirus RNA replication by binding to its 5'-terminal cloverleaf structure.

It has also been implicated in translational control of the 15-lipoxygenase mRNA, human Papillomavirus type 16 L2 mRNA, and hepatitis A virus RNA. The encoded protein is also suggested to play a part in formation of a sequence-specific alpha-globin mRNP complex which is associated with alpha-globin mRNA stability.

This multiexon structural mRNA is thought to be retrotransposed to generate PCBP-1 intronless gene which has similar functions. This gene and PCBP-1 has paralogues PCBP3 and PCBP4 which is thought to arose as a result of duplication events of entire genes. It also has two processed pseudogenes PCBP2P1 and PCBP2P2. There are presently two alternatively spliced transcript variants described for this gene.

In humans, the PCBP2 gene overlaps with TUC338, a transcribed ultra-conserved element implicated in Hepatocellular carcinoma.

== Interactions ==
PCBP2 has been shown to interact with HNRPK, PTBP1, and HNRNPL.
