= ARHGEF3 =

Protein-coding gene in the species Homo sapiens

Identifiers
- Aliases: ARHGEF3, GEF3, STA3, XPLN, Rho guanine nucleotide exchange factor 3
- External IDs: OMIM: 612115; MGI: 1918954; GeneCards: ARHGEF3
Available structures
PDB	Ortholog search: PDBe RCSB
PDB	List of PDB id codes 2Z0Q

Gene location (Human)
Chr.	Chromosome 3 (human)
Band	3p14.3	Start	56,727,418 bp
Band	3p14.3	End	57,079,329 bp

Gene location (Mouse)
Chr.	Chromosome 14 (mouse)
Band	14 A3|14 16.09 cM	Start	26,836,856 bp
Band	14 A3|14 16.09 cM	End	27,125,868 bp
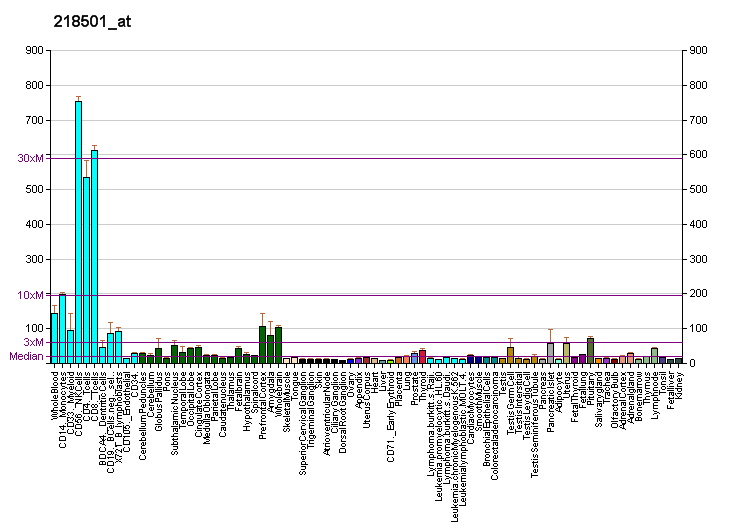
RNA expression pattern
Bgee	Human / Mouse (ortholog); Top expressed in: glomerulus; metanephric glomerulus; endothelial cell; Epithelium of choroid plexus; Brodmann area 23; germinal epithelium; middle temporal gyrus; granulocyte; oral cavity; parietal pleura / Top expressed in: granulocyte; lobe of cerebellum; pontine nuclei; cerebellar vermis; right lung; right lung lobe; subiculum; deep cerebellar nuclei; olfactory tubercle; lateral septal nucleus; More reference expression data
BioGPS	More reference expression data
Gene ontology
Molecular function	protein binding; guanyl-nucleotide exchange factor activity
Cellular component	cytoplasm; cytosol; intracellular anatomical structure
Biological process	regulation of Rho protein signal transduction; intracellular signal transduction; regulation of small GTPase mediated signal transduction; Rho protein signal transduction; positive regulation of apoptotic process; G protein-coupled receptor signaling pathway
Sources:Amigo / QuickGO
Orthologs
Databases	NCBI: entry; OMA: entry
Species	Human	Mouse
Entrez	50650	71704
Ensembl	ENSG00000163947	ENSMUSG00000021895
UniProt	Q9NR81	Q91X46
RefSeq (mRNA)	NM_001128615; NM_001128616; NM_001289698; NM_019555; NM_001377407 NM_001377408; NM_001377409; NM_001377410; NM_001377411; NM_001377412; NM_001377413; NM_001377414; NM_001377415	NM_001289686; NM_001289687; NM_001289688; NM_027871
RefSeq (protein)	NP_001122087; NP_001122088; NP_001276627; NP_062455; NP_001364336 NP_001364337; NP_001364338; NP_001364339; NP_001364340; NP_001364341; NP_001364342; NP_001364343; NP_001364344	NP_001276615; NP_001276616; NP_001276617; NP_082147
Location (UCSC)	Chr 3: 56.73 – 57.08 Mb	Chr 14: 26.84 – 27.13 Mb
PubMed search
- Wikidata
View/Edit Human	View/Edit Mouse

Rho guanine nucleotide exchange factor (GEF) 3, also known as ARHGEF3, is a human gene.

== Function ==
Rho GTPases play a fundamental role in numerous cellular processes that are initiated by extracellular stimuli that work through G protein-coupled receptors. The encoded protein may form complex with G proteins and stimulate Rho-dependent signals. This protein is similar to the NET1A protein.

== Interactions ==
ARHGEF3 has been shown to interact with RHOA and RHOB.
