= Polypyrimidine tract-binding protein =

Protein family

polypyrimidine tract binding protein 1

Identifiers
- Symbol: PTBP1
- Alt. symbols: PTB
- NCBI gene: 5725
- HGNC: 9583
- OMIM: 600693
- RefSeq: NM_002819
- UniProt: P26599

Other data
- Locus: Chr. 19 p13.3
Search for
- Structures: Swiss-model
- Domains: InterPro

polypyrimidine tract binding protein 2

Identifiers
- Symbol: PTBP2
- NCBI gene: 58155
- HGNC: 17662
- OMIM: 608449
- RefSeq: NM_021190
- UniProt: Q9UKA9

Other data
- Locus: Chr. 1 p21.3-22.1
Search for
- Structures: Swiss-model
- Domains: InterPro

Polypyrimidine tract-binding protein, also known as PTB or hnRNP I, is an RNA-binding protein. PTB functions mainly as a splicing regulator, although it is also involved in alternative 3' end processing, mRNA stability and RNA localization. Two 2020 studies have shown that depleting PTB mRNA in astrocytes can convert these astrocytes to functional neurons. These studies also show that such a treatment can be applied to the substantia nigra of mice models of Parkinson's disease in order to convert astrocytes to dopaminergic neurons and as a consequence restore motor function in these mice.

== See also ==
- Polypyrimidine tract
