= RHOB =

Protein-coding gene in the species Homo sapiens

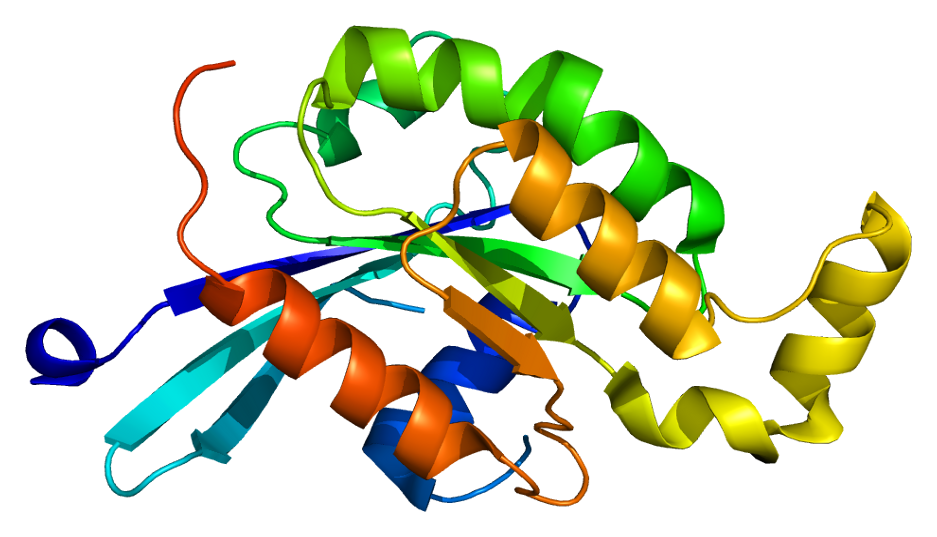

Identifiers
- Aliases: RHOB, ARH6, ARHB, MST081, MSTP081, RHOH6, ras homolog family member B
- External IDs: OMIM: 165370; MGI: 107949; GeneCards: RHOB
Available structures
PDB	Ortholog search: PDBe RCSB
PDB	List of PDB id codes 2FV8
Enzyme activity
EC #	BRENDA	ExPASy	KEGG	MetaCyc
3.6.5.2	↗	↗	↗	↗

Gene location (Human)
Chr.	Chromosome 2 (human)
Band	2p24.1	Start	20,447,074 bp
Band	2p24.1	End	20,449,440 bp

Gene location (Mouse)
Chr.	Chromosome 12 (mouse)
Band	12|12 A1.1	Start	8,547,661 bp
Band	12|12 A1.1	End	8,550,009 bp
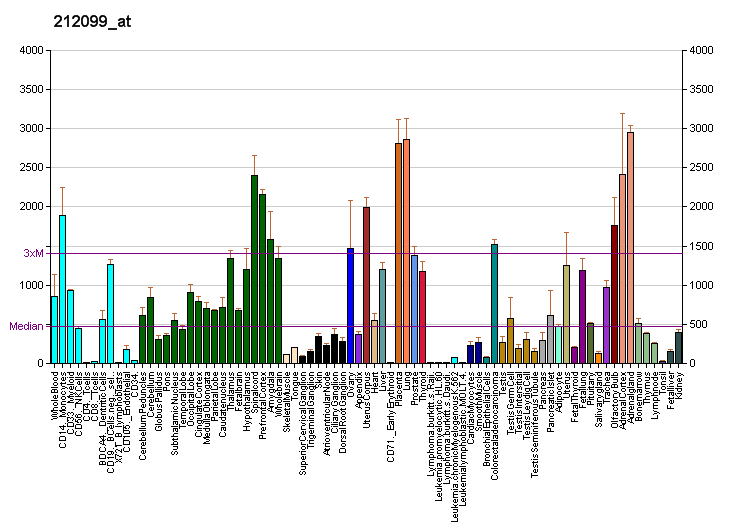
RNA expression pattern
Bgee	Human / Mouse (ortholog); Top expressed in: gastric mucosa; saphenous vein; popliteal artery; tibial arteries; vena cava; urethra; internal globus pallidus; nipple; left uterine tube; tail of epididymis / Top expressed in: molar; decidua; granulocyte; dorsomedial hypothalamic nucleus; left lung lobe; olfactory tubercle; globus pallidus; lateral geniculate nucleus; stroma of bone marrow; subiculum; More reference expression data
BioGPS	More reference expression data
Gene ontology
Molecular function	nucleotide binding; GDP binding; GTP binding; protein binding; GTPase activity; protein kinase binding
Cellular component	cytosol; endosome; late endosome; membrane; late endosome membrane; focal adhesion; plasma membrane; early endosome; cleavage furrow; endosome membrane; extracellular exosome; nucleus; intracellular anatomical structure; cytoplasm; cell cortex; cell division site; intracellular membrane-bounded organelle
Biological process	cell differentiation; regulation of cell migration; endosome to lysosome transport; endothelial tube morphogenesis; negative regulation of cell cycle; positive regulation of angiogenesis; positive regulation of endothelial cell migration; multicellular organism development; platelet activation; cell adhesion; negative regulation of cell migration; angiogenesis; Rho protein signal transduction; cellular response to ionizing radiation; protein transport; intracellular protein transport; regulation of small GTPase mediated signal transduction; cellular response to hydrogen peroxide; apoptotic process; small GTPase mediated signal transduction; positive regulation of apoptotic process; transport; mitotic cytokinesis; G protein-coupled receptor signaling pathway; actin filament organization; regulation of cell shape; cell migration; establishment or maintenance of actin cytoskeleton polarity; regulation of actin cytoskeleton organization; actin filament bundle assembly
Sources:Amigo / QuickGO
Orthologs
Databases	NCBI: entry; OMA: entry
Species	Human	Mouse
Entrez	388	11852
Ensembl	ENSG00000143878	ENSMUSG00000054364
UniProt	P62745	P62746
RefSeq (mRNA)	NM_004040	NM_007483
RefSeq (protein)	NP_004031	NP_031509
Location (UCSC)	Chr 2: 20.45 – 20.45 Mb	Chr 12: 8.55 – 8.55 Mb
PubMed search
- Wikidata
View/Edit Human	View/Edit Mouse

Ras homolog gene family, member B, also known as RHOB, is a protein which in humans is encoded by the RHOB gene.

RHOB is a member of the Rho GTP-binding protein family.

== Interactions ==
RHOB has been shown to interact with CIT, ARHGEF3, ARHGDIG and RHPN2.

== See also ==
- neural crest
