= TUC338 =

Identifiers
- Symbol: TUC338

Other data
- RNA type: Gene
- Domain: Vertebrata
- Locus: Chr. 12 q
- PDB structures: PDBe

TUC338 (transcribed ultra-conserved region 338) is an ultra-conserved element which is transcribed to give a non-coding RNA. The TUC338 gene was first identified as uc.338, along with 480 other ultra-conserved elements in the human genome. Expression of this RNA gene has been found to dramatically increase in hepatocellular carcinoma (HCC) cells.

The TUC338 RNA gene is 590 base-pairs long, and partially overlaps the gene encoding Poly(rC)-binding protein 2 (PCBP2), a protein involved in mRNA processing. Despite this overlap, PCBP2 and TUC388 were found to be independently expressed.

TUC338 is predicted to function in cell growth, possibly at the interface between G1 phase and S phase, and could potentially present a therapeutic target to treat HCC cells. Experimental evidence shows knocking out TUC338 using siRNA reduced the growth rate of both mouse and human HCC cells.
