= HNRNPL =

Protein-coding gene in the species Homo sapiens

Identifiers
- Aliases: HNRNPL, HNRPL, hnRNP-L, P/OKcl.14, heterogeneous nuclear ribonucleoprotein L
- External IDs: OMIM: 603083; MGI: 104816; GeneCards: HNRNPL
Available structures
PDB	Ortholog search: PDBe RCSB
PDB	List of PDB id codes 3R27, 3TO8

Gene location (Human)
Chr.	Chromosome 19 (human)
Band	19q13.2	Start	38,836,388 bp
Band	19q13.2	End	38,852,347 bp

Gene location (Mouse)
Chr.	Chromosome 7 (mouse)
Band	7|7 B1	Start	28,507,966 bp
Band	7|7 B1	End	28,521,691 bp
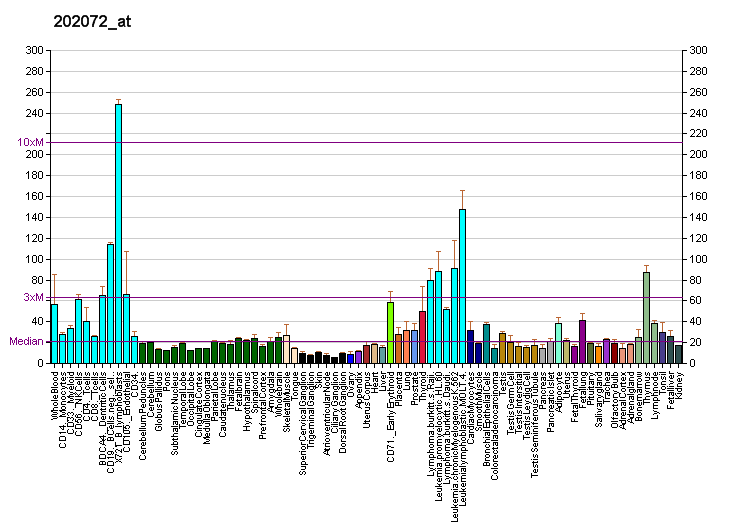

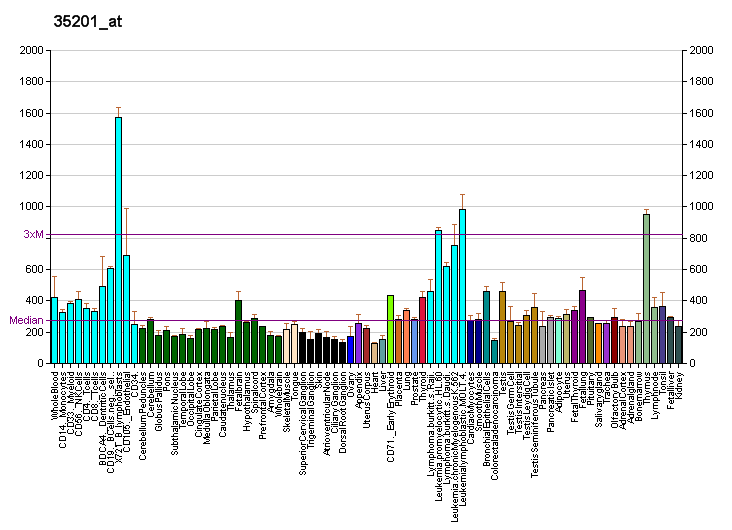
RNA expression pattern
Bgee	Human / Mouse (ortholog); Top expressed in: ventricular zone; ganglionic eminence; left lobe of thyroid gland; right lobe of thyroid gland; skin of abdomen; body of uterus; granulocyte; skin of leg; olfactory zone of nasal mucosa; right uterine tube / Top expressed in: neural layer of retina; genital tubercle; ventricular zone; tail of embryo; spermatocyte; epiblast; lip; superior frontal gyrus; endocardial cushion; yolk sac; More reference expression data
BioGPS	More reference expression data
Gene ontology
Molecular function	protein binding; pre-mRNA intronic binding; nucleic acid binding; RNA binding; mRNA 3'-UTR binding; mRNA CDS binding
Cellular component	cytoplasm; ribonucleoprotein granule; extracellular exosome; membrane; nucleus; nucleoplasm; pronucleus; cytosol; perinuclear region of cytoplasm; ribonucleoprotein complex
Biological process	mRNA splicing, via spliceosome; mRNA processing; RNA processing; RNA metabolic process; regulation of alternative mRNA splicing, via spliceosome; circadian rhythm; cellular response to amino acid starvation; positive regulation of translation; negative regulation of mRNA splicing, via spliceosome; response to peptide; positive regulation of mRNA binding
Sources:Amigo / QuickGO
Orthologs
Databases	NCBI: entry; OMA: entry
Species	Human	Mouse
Entrez	3191	15388
Ensembl	ENSG00000104824; ENSG00000282947	ENSMUSG00000015165
UniProt	P14866	Q8R081
RefSeq (mRNA)	NM_001005335; NM_001533	NM_177301
RefSeq (protein)	NP_001005335; NP_001524	NP_796275; NP_001389864; NP_001389865; NP_001389866; NP_001389867 NP_001389868
Location (UCSC)	Chr 19: 38.84 – 38.85 Mb	Chr 7: 28.51 – 28.52 Mb
PubMed search
- Wikidata
View/Edit Human	View/Edit Mouse

Heterogeneous nuclear ribonucleoprotein L is a protein that in humans is encoded by the HNRNPL gene.

== Function ==
Heterogeneous nuclear RNAs (hnRNAs) which include mRNA precursors and mature mRNAs are associated with specific proteins to form heterogeneous ribonucleoprotein (hnRNP) complexes. Heterogeneous nuclear ribonucleoprotein L is among the proteins that are stably associated with hnRNP complexes and along with other hnRNP proteins is likely to play a major role in the formation, packaging, processing, and function of mRNA. Heterogeneous nuclear ribonucleoprotein L is present in the nucleoplasm as part of the HNRP complex. HNRP proteins have also been identified outside of the nucleoplasm. Exchange of hnRNP for mRNA-binding proteins accompanies transport of mRNA from the nucleus to the cytoplasm. Since HNRP proteins have been shown to shuttle between the nucleus and the cytoplasm, it is possible that they also have cytoplasmic functions. Two transcript variants encoding different isoforms have been found for this gene.

== Interactions ==
HNRNPL has been shown to interact with:

- HNRNPLL,
- HNRPK,
- PCBP2, and
- PTBP1.
