= ZRSR2 =

Protein-coding gene in the species Homo sapiens

Identifiers
- Aliases: ZRSR2, U2AF1-RS2, U2AF1L2, U2AF1RS2, URP, ZC3H22, zinc finger CCCH-type, RNA binding motif and serine/arginine rich 2
- External IDs: OMIM: 300028; MGI: 103287; GeneCards: ZRSR2

Gene location (Human)
Chr.	X chromosome (human)
Band	Xp22.2	Start	15,790,156 bp
Band	Xp22.2	End	15,830,694 bp

Gene location (Mouse)
Chr.	X chromosome (mouse)
Band	X F5|X 75.99 cM	Start	162,718,439 bp
Band	X F5|X 75.99 cM	End	162,741,657 bp
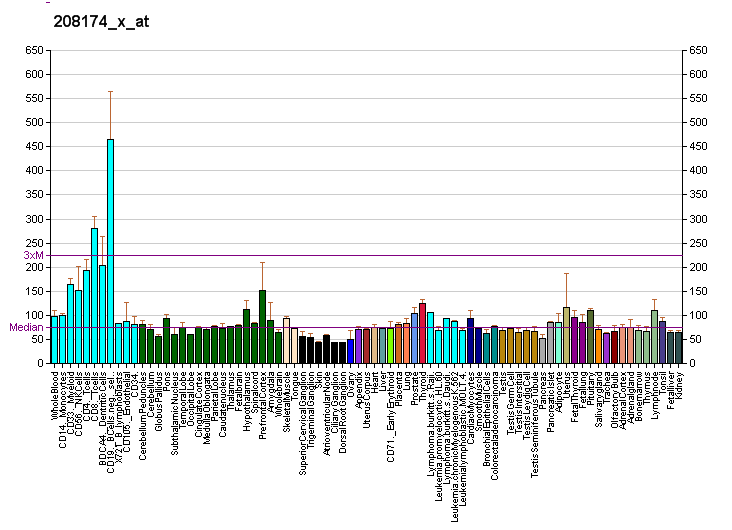

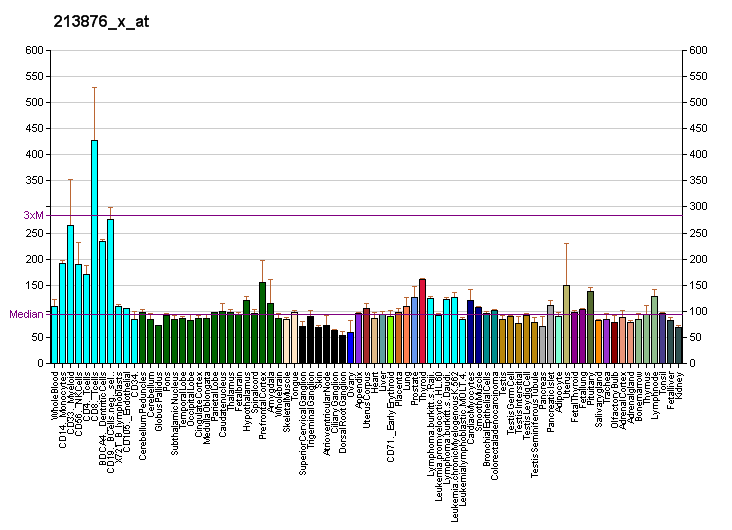
RNA expression pattern
Bgee	Human / Mouse (ortholog); Top expressed in: sural nerve; granulocyte; monocyte; tendon of biceps brachii; external globus pallidus; tibial arteries; spleen; gastric mucosa; Descending thoracic aorta; lymph node / Top expressed in: genital tubercle; tail of embryo; yolk sac; retinal pigment epithelium; zygote; primitive streak; embryo; Epithelium of choroid plexus; granulocyte; muscle of thigh; More reference expression data
BioGPS	More reference expression data
Gene ontology
Molecular function	metal ion binding; nucleic acid binding; pre-mRNA 3'-splice site binding; RNA binding; protein binding
Cellular component	nucleus; spliceosomal complex; U12-type spliceosomal complex; nucleoplasm; U2AF complex
Biological process	mRNA processing; spliceosomal complex assembly; RNA splicing; mRNA splicing, via spliceosome
Sources:Amigo / QuickGO
Orthologs
Databases	NCBI: entry; OMA: entry
Species	Human	Mouse
Entrez	8233	22184
Ensembl	ENSG00000169249	ENSMUSG00000031370
UniProt	Q15696	Q62377
RefSeq (mRNA)	NM_005089	NM_009453; NM_178794
RefSeq (protein)	NP_005080	n/a
Location (UCSC)	Chr X: 15.79 – 15.83 Mb	Chr X: 162.72 – 162.74 Mb
PubMed search
- Wikidata
View/Edit Human	View/Edit Mouse

U2 small nuclear ribonucleoprotein auxiliary factor 35 kDa subunit-related protein 2 is a protein that in humans is encoded by the ZRSR2 gene.

This gene encodes an essential splicing factor. The encoded protein associates with the U2 auxiliary factor heterodimer, which is required for the recognition of a functional 3' splice site in pre-mRNA splicing, and may play a role in network interactions during spliceosome assembly.
