= PTBP2 =

Protein found in humans

Identifiers
- Aliases: PTBP2, PTBLP, brPTB, nPTB, polypyrimidine tract binding protein 2
- External IDs: OMIM: 608449; MGI: 1860489; GeneCards: PTBP2
Available structures
PDB	Ortholog search: PDBe RCSB
PDB	List of PDB id codes 2CQ1, 2MJU, 4CQ1

Gene location (Human)
Chr.	Chromosome 1 (human)
Band	1p21.3	Start	96,721,665 bp
Band	1p21.3	End	96,823,738 bp

Gene location (Mouse)
Chr.	Chromosome 3 (mouse)
Band	3|3 G1	Start	119,512,391 bp
Band	3|3 G1	End	119,578,115 bp
RNA expression pattern
Bgee	Human / Mouse (ortholog); Top expressed in: ganglionic eminence; corpus callosum; ventricular zone; Achilles tendon; pars compacta; gastric mucosa; secondary oocyte; pars reticulata; testicle; muscle layer of sigmoid colon / Top expressed in: spermatocyte; genital tubercle; medial ganglionic eminence; tail of embryo; pineal gland; superior cervical ganglion; ventricular zone; ventral tegmental area; ventromedial nucleus; maxillary prominence; More reference expression data
BioGPS	n/a
Gene ontology
Molecular function	mRNA binding; pre-mRNA binding; nucleic acid binding; RNA binding
Cellular component	growth cone; spliceosomal complex; soma; nucleus
Biological process	mRNA splice site selection; cerebellum development; mRNA processing; RNA splicing; spinal cord development; regulation of neural precursor cell proliferation; negative regulation of RNA splicing
Sources:Amigo / QuickGO
Orthologs
Databases	NCBI: entry; OMA: entry
Species	Human	Mouse
Entrez	58155	56195
Ensembl	ENSG00000117569	ENSMUSG00000028134
UniProt	Q9UKA9	Q91Z31
RefSeq (mRNA)	NM_001300985; NM_001300986; NM_001300987; NM_001300988; NM_001300989 NM_001300990; NM_021190	NM_019550; NM_001310711
RefSeq (protein)	NP_001287914; NP_001287915; NP_001287916; NP_001287917; NP_001287918 NP_001287919; NP_067013	NP_001297640; NP_062423
Location (UCSC)	Chr 1: 96.72 – 96.82 Mb	Chr 3: 119.51 – 119.58 Mb
PubMed search
- Wikidata
View/Edit Human	View/Edit Mouse

Polypyrimidine tract binding protein 2, also known as PTBP2, is a protein which in humans is encoded by the PTBP2 gene.

== Function ==
The protein encoded by this gene binds to the intronic cluster of RNA regulatory elements, downstream control sequence (DCS). It is implicated in controlling the assembly of other splicing-regulatory proteins. This protein is very similar to the polypyrimidine tract-binding protein PTBP1 but it is expressed primarily in the brain.
