= RHPN2 =

Protein-coding nucleic acid in the species Homo sapiens

Identifiers
- Aliases: RHPN2, P76RBE, RHOBP, rhophilin, Rho GTPase binding protein 2, rhophilin Rho GTPase binding protein 2
- External IDs: OMIM: 617932; MGI: 1289234; GeneCards: RHPN2
Available structures
| PDB | Ortholog search: PDBe RCSB |
| PDB | List of PDB id codes 2VSV |

Gene location (Human)
| Chr. | Chromosome 19 (human) |
| Band | 19q13.11 | Start | 32,978,592 bp |
| Band | 19q13.11 | End | 33,064,888 bp |

Gene location (Mouse)
| Chr. | Chromosome 7 (mouse) |
| Band | 7 B2|7 21.36 cM | Start | 35,033,595 bp |
| Band | 7 B2|7 21.36 cM | End | 35,091,714 bp |
RNA expression pattern
| Bgee | Human / Mouse (ortholog); Top expressed in: pancreatic epithelial cell; pancreatic ductal cell; mucosa of ileum; oocyte; bronchial epithelial cell; mucosa of sigmoid colon; parotid gland; secondary oocyte; jejunal mucosa; germinal epithelium / Top expressed in: secondary oocyte; primary oocyte; zygote; parotid gland; submandibular gland; epithelium of stomach; lacrimal gland; left colon; migratory enteric neural crest cell; vestibular membrane of cochlear duct; More reference expression data |
| BioGPS | n/a |
Orthologs
| Databases | NCBI: entry; OMA: entry |
| Species | Human | Mouse |
| Entrez | 85415 | 52428 |
| Ensembl | ENSG00000131941 | ENSMUSG00000030494 |
| UniProt | Q8IUC4 | Q8BWR8 |
| RefSeq (mRNA) | NM_033103 | NM_027897 |
| RefSeq (protein) | NP_149094 | NP_082173 |
| Location (UCSC) | Chr 19: 32.98 – 33.06 Mb | Chr 7: 35.03 – 35.09 Mb |
| PubMed search |
- Wikidata
| View/Edit Human | View/Edit Mouse |

Rhophilin-2 is a protein that in humans is encoded by the RHPN2 gene.

== Interactions ==
RHPN2 has been shown to interact with RHOB.
