= Ultraconserved element =

Sections of the genome experiencing minimal changes across species

An ultraconserved element (UCE) is a region of the genome that is shared between evolutionarily distant taxa and shows little or no variation between those taxa. These regions and regions adjacent to them (flanking DNA) are useful for tracing the evolutionary history of groups of organisms. Another term for ultraconserved element is ultraconserved region (UCR).

The term "ultraconserved element" was originally defined as a genome segment longer than 200 base pairs (bp) that is absolutely conserved, with no insertions or deletions and 100% identity, between orthologous regions of the human, rat, and mouse genomes. 481 of these segments have been identified in the human genome. If ribosomal DNA (rDNA regions) are excluded, these range in size from 200 bp to 781 bp. UCEs are found on all human chromosomes except for 21 and Y.

Since its creation, this term's usage has broadened to include more evolutionarily distant species or shorter segments, for example 100 bp instead of 200 bp. By some definitions, segments need not be syntenic between species. Human UCEs also show high conservation with more evolutionarily distant species, such as chicken and fugu. Out of 481 identified human UCEs, approximately 97% align with high identity to the chicken genome, though only 4% of the human genome can be reliably aligned to the chicken genome. Similarly, the same sequences in the fugu genome have 68% identity to human UCEs, despite the human genome only reliably aligning to 1.8% of the fugu genome. Despite often being noncoding DNA, some ultraconserved elements have been found to be transcriptionally active, producing non-coding RNA molecules.

== Evolution ==
Researchers originally assumed that perfect conservation of these long stretches of DNA implied evolutionary importance, as these regions appear to have experienced strong negative (purifying) selection for 300-400 million years. More recently, this assumption has been replaced by two main hypotheses: that UCEs are created through a reduced negative selection rate, or through reduced mutation rates, also known as a "cold spot" of evolution. Many studies have examined the validity of each hypothesis. The probability of finding ultraconserved elements by chance (under neutral evolution) has been estimated at less than 10^{−22} in 2.9 billion bases. In support of the cold spot hypothesis, UCEs were found to be mutating 20 fold less than expected under conservative models for neutral mutation rates. This fold change difference in mutation rates was consistent between humans, chimpanzees, and chickens. Ultraconserved elements are not exempt from mutations, as exemplified by the presence of 29,983 polymorphisms in the UCE regions of the human genome assembly GRCh38. However, affected phenotypes were only caused by 112 of these polymorphisms, most of which were located in coding regions of the UCEs. A study performed in mice determined that deleting UCEs from the genome did not create obvious deleterious phenotypes, despite deletion of UCEs in proximity to promoters and protein coding genes. Affected mice were fertile and targeted screens of the nearby coding genes showed no altered phenotype. A separate mouse study demonstrated that ultraconserved enhancers were robust to mutagenesis, concluding that perfect conservation of UCE sequences is not required for their function, which would suggest another reason for the sequence consistency besides evolutionary importance. Computational analysis of human ultraconserved noncoding elements (UCNEs) found that the regions are enriched for A-T sequences and are generally GC poor. However, the UNCEs were found to be enriched for CpG, or highly methylated. This may indicate that there is some change to DNA structure in these regions favoring their precise retention, but this possibility has not been validated through testing.

== Function ==
Often, ultraconserved elements are located near transcriptional regulators or developmental genes performing functions such as gene enhancing and splicing regulation. A study comparing ultraconserved elements between humans and the Japanese puffer fish Takifugu rubripes proposed an importance in vertebrate development. Double-knockouts of UCEs near the ARX gene in mice caused a shrunken hippocampus in the brain, though the effect was not lethal. Some UCEs are not transcribed, and are referred to as ultraconserved noncoding elements. However, many UCRs in humans are extensively transcribed. A small number of those which are transcribed, known as transcribed UCEs (T-UCEs), have been connected with human carcinomas and leukemias. For example, TUC338 is strongly upregulated in human hepatocellular carcinoma cells. Indeed, UCEs are often affected by copy number variation in cancer cells much more than in healthy contexts, suggesting that altering the copy number of T-UCEs may be deleterious.

== Role in human disease ==
Research has demonstrated that T-UCRs have a tissue-specific expression, and a differential expression profile between tumors and other diseases. The tables below highlight transcripts and polymorphisms within UCRs that have been shown to contribute to human diseases. For example, UCRs tend to accumulate less mutations than flanking segments, in both neoplastic and non-neoplastic samples from persons with hereditary non-polyposis colorectal cancer.

=== Regulation mechanisms of disease related ultraconserved element transcripts ===
| miR/methylation/transcript factor associated with T-UCRs | Disease | References |
| miR-24-1/uc.160 | Leukemia | Calin et al., 2007 |
| miR-130b/uc.63 | Prostate CA | Sekino et al., 2017 |
| miR-153/uc.416 | Colorectal and renal CA | Goto et al., 2016; Sekino et al., 2017 |
| miR-155/uc.160 | Gastric CA | Calin et al., 2007; Pang et al., 2018 |
| miR-155/uc346A | Leukemia | Calin et al., 2007 |
| mir-195/uc.283 | Bladder CA | Liz et al., 2014 |
| miR-195, miR-4668/uc.372 | Lipid metabolism | Guo et al., 2018 |
| mir-195/uc.173 | Gastrointestinal tract | Xiao et al., 2018 |
| miR-214/uc.276 | Colorectal CA | Wojcik et al., 2010 |
| miR-291a-3p/uc.173 | Nervous system | Nan et al., 2016 |
| miR-29b/uc.173 | Gastrointestinal tract | J. Y. Wang et al., 2018 |
| miR-339-3p, miR-663b-3p, miR-95-5p/uc.339 | Lung CA | Vannini et al., 2017 |
| miR-596/uc.8 | Bladder CA | Olivieri et al., 2016 |
| DNA methylation/uc.160, uc.283, and uc.346 | Colorectal CA | Kottorou et al., 2018 |
| DNA methylation/uc.158 + A, uc.160+, uc.241 + A, uc.283 + A, uc.346 + A | Gastric CA | Goto et al., 2016; Lujambio et al., 2010 |
| Transcription factor SP1/uc.138 (TRA2β4) | Colorectal CA | Kajita et al., 2016 |
| Transcription factor YY1/uc.8 | Bladder CA | Terreri et al., 2016 |

=== Phenotype-associated polymorphisms within ultraconserved elements ===
| Polymorphism name | Associated phenotype description | Source |
| rs17105335 | Amyotrophic lateral sclerosis | Cronin et al. (2008) |
| rs2020906 | Lynch syndrome | Hansen et al. (2014) |
| rs10496382 | Height | Chiang et al. (2012) |
| rs13382811 | Severe myopia | Khor et al. (2013) |
| rs104893634 | Vertical talus congenital | Dobbs et al. (2006); Shrimpton et al. (2004) |
| rs2307121 | Central corneal thickness | Lu et al. (2013) |
| rs587777277 | Bosch-Boonstra-Schaaf optic atrophy syndrome | Bosch et al. (2014) |
| rs587777275 | Bosch-Boonstra-Schaaf optic atrophy syndrome | Bosch et al. (2014) |
| rs587777274 | Bosch-Boonstra-Schaaf optic atrophy syndrome | Bosch et al. (2014) |
| rs387906239 | Familial adenomatous polyposis 1 attenuated | Soravia et al. (1999) |
| rs3797704 | No association with breast cancer | Chang et al. (2016) |
| rs387906232 | Familial adenomatous polyposis 1 | Fodde et al. (1992) |
| rs387906237 | Familial adenomatous polyposis 1 attenuated | Curia et al. (1998) |
| rs121434591 | Distal myopathy | Senderek et al. (2009) |
| rs587777300 | Amyotrophic lateral sclerosis 21 | Johnson et al. (2014) |
| rs863223403 | Au-Kline syndrome | Au et al. (2015) |
| rs121917900 | Cockayne syndrome B | Mallery et al. (1998) |
| rs75462234 | Papillorenal syndrome | Schimmenti et al. (1999) |
| rs77453353 | Renal coloboma syndrome | Amiel et al. (2000) |
| rs76675173 | Papillorenal syndrome | Schimmenti et al. (1997) |
| rs587777708 | Focal segmental glomerulosclerosis 7 | Barua et al. (2014) |
| rs11190870 | Adolescent idiopathic scoliosis, no association with breast cancer | Chettier et al. (2015); Gao et al. (2013); Grauers et al. (2015); Jiang et al. (2013); Londono et al. (2014); Miyake et al. (2013); Shen et al. (2011); Takahashi et al. (2011) |
| rs724159963 | Peroxisomal fatty acyl-CoA reductase 1 disorder | Buchert et al. (2014) |
| rs16932455 | Capecitabine sensitivity | O'Donnell et al. (2012) |
| rs997295 | Motion sickness; BMI | De et al. (2015); Guo et al. (2013); Hromatka et al. |
| rs587777373 | Congenital heart defects multiple types 4 | Al Turki et al. (2014) |
| rs398123839 | Duchenne muscular dystrophy | Hofstra et al. (2004); Roberts et al. (1992) |
| rs863224976 | Becker muscular dystrophy | Tuffery-Giraud et al. (2005) |
| rs132630295 | Spastic paraplegia 2 X-linked | Gorman et al. (2007) |
| rs132630287 | Spastic paraplegia 2 X-linked | Saugier-Veber et al. (1994) |
| rs132630292 | Pelizaeus/Merzbacher disease atypical | Hodes et al. (1997) |
| rs137852350 | Mental retardation X-linked 94 | Wu et al. (2007) |
| rs122459149 | Emery-Dreifuss muscular dystrophy 6 X-linked | Gueneau et al. (2009); Knoblauch et al. (2010) |
| rs122458141 | Myopathy X-linked with postural muscle atrophy | Schoser et al. (2009); Windpassinger et al. (2008) |
| rs786200914 | Myopathy X-linked with postural muscle atrophy | Schoser et al. (2009) |
| rs267606811 | Myopathy X-linked with postural muscle atrophy | Windpassinger et al. (2008) |
| rs62621672 | Rett syndrome (nonpathogenic variant) | Zahorakova et al. (2007) |

== See also ==
- Human accelerated regions
