= PTBP1 =

Protein-coding gene in the species Homo sapiens

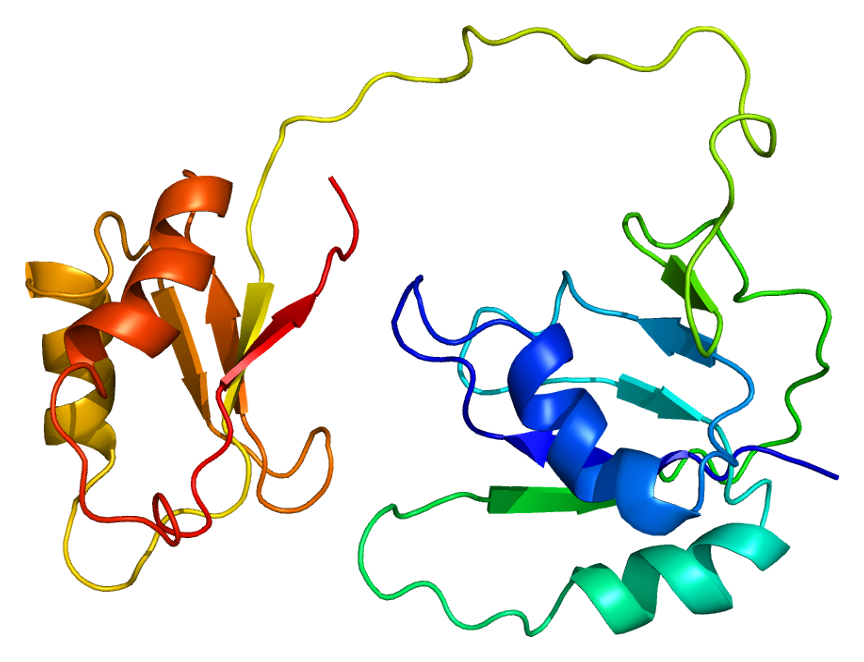

Identifiers
- Aliases: PTBP1, HNRNP-I, HNRNPI, HNRPI, PTB, PTB-1, PTB-T, PTB2, PTB3, PTB4, pPTB, polypyrimidine tract binding protein 1
- External IDs: OMIM: 600693; MGI: 97791; GeneCards: PTBP1
Available structures
PDB	Ortholog search: PDBe RCSB
PDB	List of PDB id codes 1QM9, 1SJQ, 1SJR, 2AD9, 2ADB, 2ADC, 2EVZ, 3ZZY, 3ZZZ

Gene location (Human)
Chr.	Chromosome 19 (human)
Band	19p13.3	Start	797,075 bp
Band	19p13.3	End	812,327 bp

Gene location (Mouse)
Chr.	Chromosome 10 (mouse)
Band	10 C1|10 39.72 cM	Start	79,690,261 bp
Band	10 C1|10 39.72 cM	End	79,700,605 bp
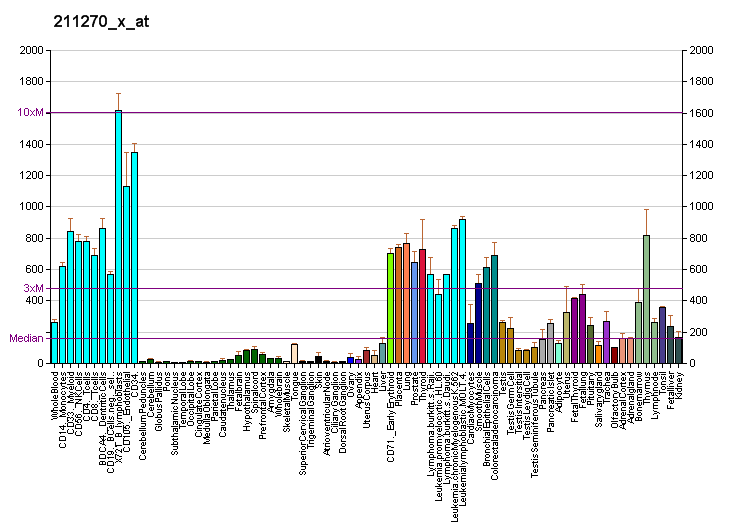

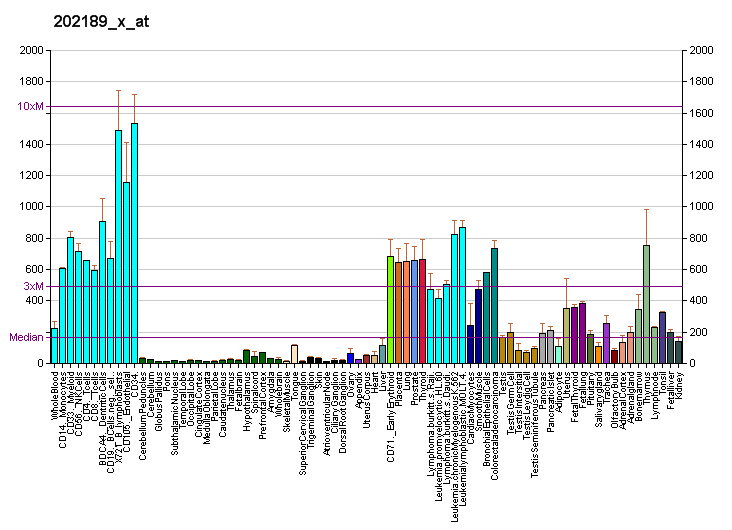

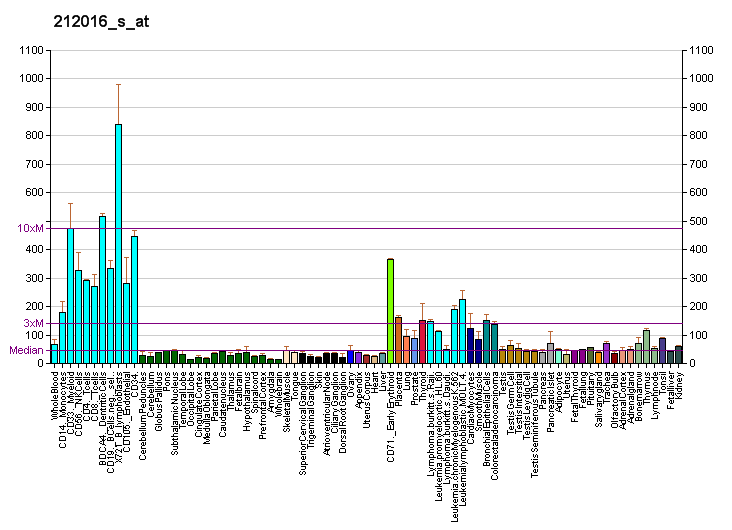
RNA expression pattern
Bgee	Human / Mouse (ortholog); Top expressed in: thymus; nipple; mucosa of pharynx; stromal cell of endometrium; human penis; pancreatic ductal cell; pylorus; islet of Langerhans; cecum; ventricular zone / Top expressed in: tail of embryo; genital tubercle; zygote; yolk sac; ventricular zone; lip; embryo; embryo; morula; blastocyst; More reference expression data
BioGPS	More reference expression data
Gene ontology
Molecular function	pre-mRNA binding; protein binding; poly-pyrimidine tract binding; nucleic acid binding; RNA binding
Cellular component	nucleolus; extracellular exosome; membrane; nucleus; nucleoplasm
Biological process	mRNA splicing, via spliceosome; mRNA processing; negative regulation of mRNA splicing, via spliceosome; regulation of alternative mRNA splicing, via spliceosome; negative regulation of RNA splicing; RNA splicing; negative regulation of muscle cell differentiation; fibroblast growth factor receptor signaling pathway; IRES-dependent viral translational initiation; RNA metabolic process; positive regulation of protein dephosphorylation; positive regulation of calcineurin-NFAT signaling cascade
Sources:Amigo / QuickGO
Orthologs
Databases	NCBI: entry; OMA: entry
Species	Human	Mouse
Entrez	5725	19205
Ensembl	ENSG00000011304	ENSMUSG00000006498
UniProt	P26599	P17225
RefSeq (mRNA)	NM_002819; NM_031990; NM_031991; NM_175847	NM_001077363; NM_001283013; NM_008956
RefSeq (protein)	NP_002810; NP_114367; NP_114368	n/a
Location (UCSC)	Chr 19: 0.8 – 0.81 Mb	Chr 10: 79.69 – 79.7 Mb
PubMed search
- Wikidata
View/Edit Human	View/Edit Mouse

Polypyrimidine tract-binding protein 1 is a protein that in humans is encoded by the PTBP1 gene.

This gene belongs to the subfamily of ubiquitously expressed heterogeneous nuclear ribonucleoproteins (hnRNPs). The hnRNPs are RNA-binding proteins and they complex with heterogeneous nuclear RNA (hnRNA). These proteins are associated with pre-mRNAs in the nucleus and appear to influence pre-mRNA processing and other aspects of mRNA metabolism and transport. While all of the hnRNPs are present in the nucleus, some seem to shuttle between the nucleus and the cytoplasm. The hnRNP proteins have distinct nucleic acid binding properties. The protein encoded by this gene has four repeats of quasi-RNA recognition motif (RRM) domains that bind RNAs. This protein binds to the intronic polypyrimidine tracts that requires pre-mRNA splicing and acts via the protein degradation ubiquitin-proteasome pathway. It may also promote the binding of U2 snRNP to pre-mRNAs. This protein is localized in the nucleoplasm and it is also detected in the perinucleolar structure. Alternatively spliced transcript variants encoding different isoforms have been described.

== Evolution ==
In brains of mammals, transcripts from the PTBP1 gene are missing one exon (exon 9) that is included in the brains of other vertebrates, as a result of alternative splicing. This contributes to the evolutionary difference between the nervous system of mammals and other vertebrates.

== Interactions ==
PTBP1 has been shown to interact with HNRPK, PCBP2, SFPQ and HNRNPL.

This gene is targeted by the microRNA miR-124. During neuronal differentiation, miR-124 reduces PTBP1 levels, leading to the accumulation of correctly spliced PTBP2 mRNA and a dramatic increase in PTBP2 protein.
