= Monoaminylation =

Post-translational modification

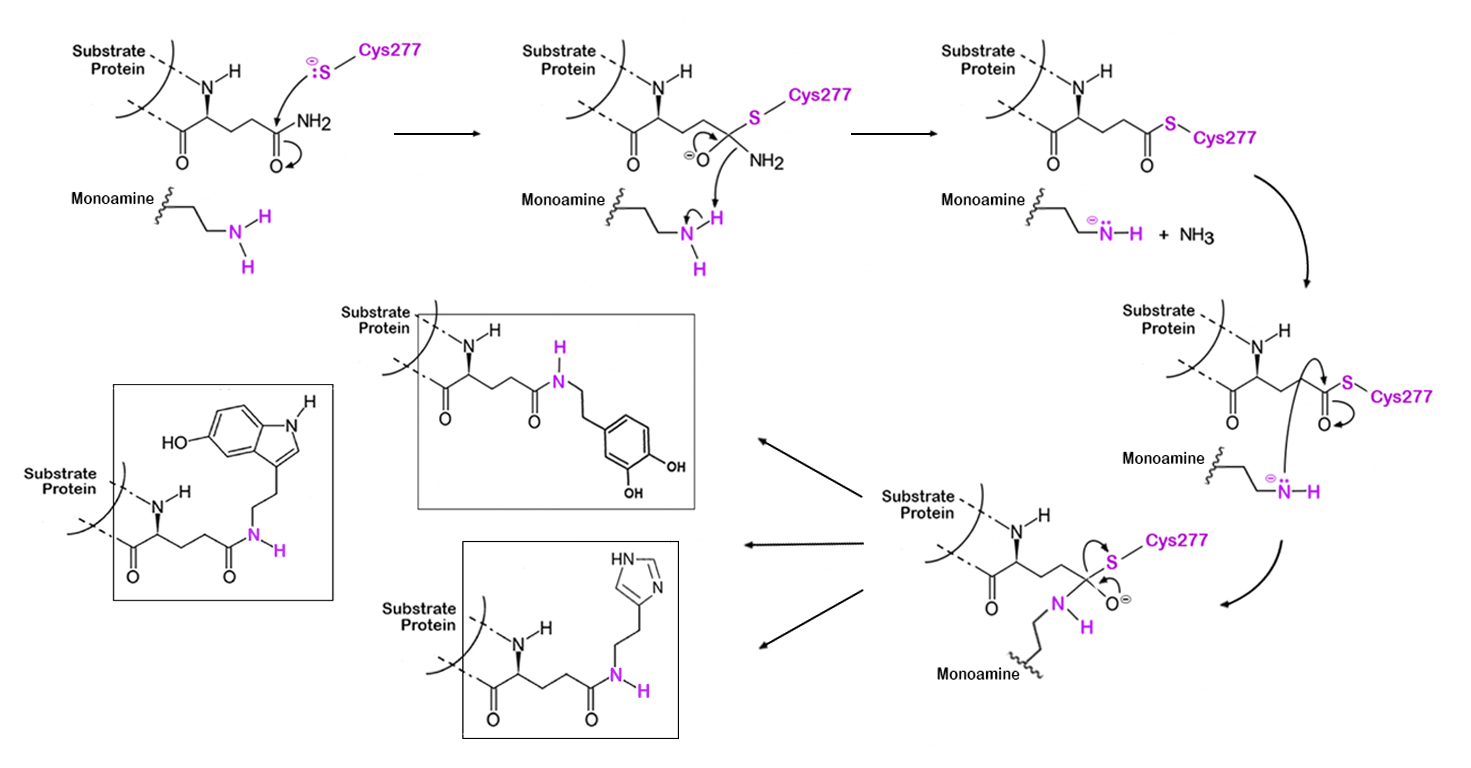
- Post-translational modification in which monoamines are covalently attached to glutamine residues via reactions catalyzed by TGM2.

Biochemical Reaction
- Part of: Cell
- Located: Nucleus, Cytoplasm
- Category: Post-translational Modification

Central Functions
- Modulation of Synaptic Activity Neuroepigenetic & Neuroproteomic Regulation Placental Signaling & Embryonic Development Regulation of Circadian Rhythm

Key Enzymes
- Transglutaminase 2 (TGM2)

Discovered
1957	Heinrich Waelsch & Colleagues; Discover calcium-dependent transglutaminases (TGMs)
2003	Diego Walther & Colleagues; Discover protein serotonylation for the first time
2011	Diego Walther & Colleagues; Propose monoaminylation as a novel set of post-translational modifications
2012	Jakob Vowinckel & Colleagues; Discover protein histaminylation as a novel post-translational modification
2019	Lorna Farrelly & Colleagues; Discover histone serotonylation as a novel post-translational modification
2020	Ashley Lepack & Colleagues; Discover histone dopaminylation as a novel post-translational modification
2025	Qingfei Zheng & Colleagues; Discover histone histaminylation as a novel post-translational modification
- Category

Protein monoaminylation refers to the post-translational modification in which monoamines (i.e., dopamine, serotonin, histamine) are covalently attached to glutamine residues via transamidation. Monoaminylation itself refers to the overall class of post-translational modifications involving monoamines; however, these reactions are further classified by the individual monoamine reactant they describe (i.e., dopaminylation, serotonylation, histaminylation).

Monoaminylation has been reported for both histone and non-histone protein substrates, and thus represents a distinct neuroepigenetic and neuroproteomic regulatory mechanism with various implications in health and disease. Recent studies have unveiled the critical role of monoaminylation in mediating a wide range of physiological processes, be that in the nervous system or beyond.

Monoaminylation is known to contribute to several significant diseases, including schizophrenia and various cancers. To date, notable protein monoaminylation substrates include a number of metabolic enzymes, signal transduction proteins, and cytoskeletal proteins, as well as histone H3.

Monoaminylation has been reported in various cell types and tissues, including monoaminergic neurons, mammary epithelial cells, vascular smooth muscle, cancer-associated fibroblasts, enterochromaffin cells, platelets, neutrophils, CD8+ T cells, endothelial cells of the lung, and pancreatic 𝛽-cells. It is also known to influence both tumorigenesis and cancer metastasis, and has been associated with several forms of cancer, including colorectal cancer, neuroendocrine prostate cancer, pancreatic cancer, hepatocellular carcinoma, and ependymomas (brain cancer).

== Identification ==
Protein monoaminylation was first identified in 1957 by Heinrich Waelsch and colleagues at Columbia University. After discovering that primary amines could be covalently incorporated into proteins via transamidation at glutamine residues, the group went on to uncover the enzyme catalyzing these reactions, effectively naming it "transglutaminase" after its function.

Despite its discovery in the mid-twentieth century, protein monoaminylation was not investigated as a post-translational modification until 2003, when Diego Walther and colleagues at the Max-Planck-Institute for Molecular Genetics revealed that serotonylation of small GTPases mediates ⍺-granule release during the activation and aggregation of platelets.

Notably, histone monoaminylation was not uncovered as an epigenetic regulatory mechanism until 2019, when Lorna Farrelly and colleagues at the Icahn School of Medicine reported the H3Q5-serotonylation (H3Q5ser) modification for the first time. Later, in 2020, the H3Q5-dopaminylation (H3Q5dop) modification was identified in the striatum by Ashley Lepack and colleagues also at the Icahn School of Medicine. Five years later, Qingfei Zheng and colleagues at Ohio State University discovered the H3Q5-histaminylation (H3Q5his) modification in histaminergic neurons.

== Mechanism ==
Monoaminylation is catalyzed by transglutaminase 2 (TGM2) in a calcium-dependent manner, and relies upon the intracellular bioavailability of monoamine substrates. Generally, protein monoaminylation occurs in the cytoplasm; however, histone monoaminylation only occurs within the nucleus. Nevertheless, the mechanism for TGM2-catalyzed monoaminylation is identical for both histone and non-histone proteins.

Structurally, Ca^{2+} binds directly to TGM2 itself and not to the substrate molecule. Once Ca^{2+} binds to TGM2, a 4 nm relaxation about the major axis of the protein exposes the active site to available substrates. The active site itself is composed of a well conserved catalytic triad (Cys277–His335–Asp358) situated within a substrate binding channel, which is bordered by two conserved residues (Trp241 and Trp332) that facilitate catalysis through stabilization of the transition state. Once intracellular Ca^{2+} binds to TGM2 and exposes the substrate binding channel, the glutamine residue of a substrate protein (i.e., histone H3, RhoA) is free to enter the enzyme active site. As a transamidation reaction, the mechanism for protein monoaminylation can be summarized in two parts: an initial thioester formation, followed by isopeptide bond formation.

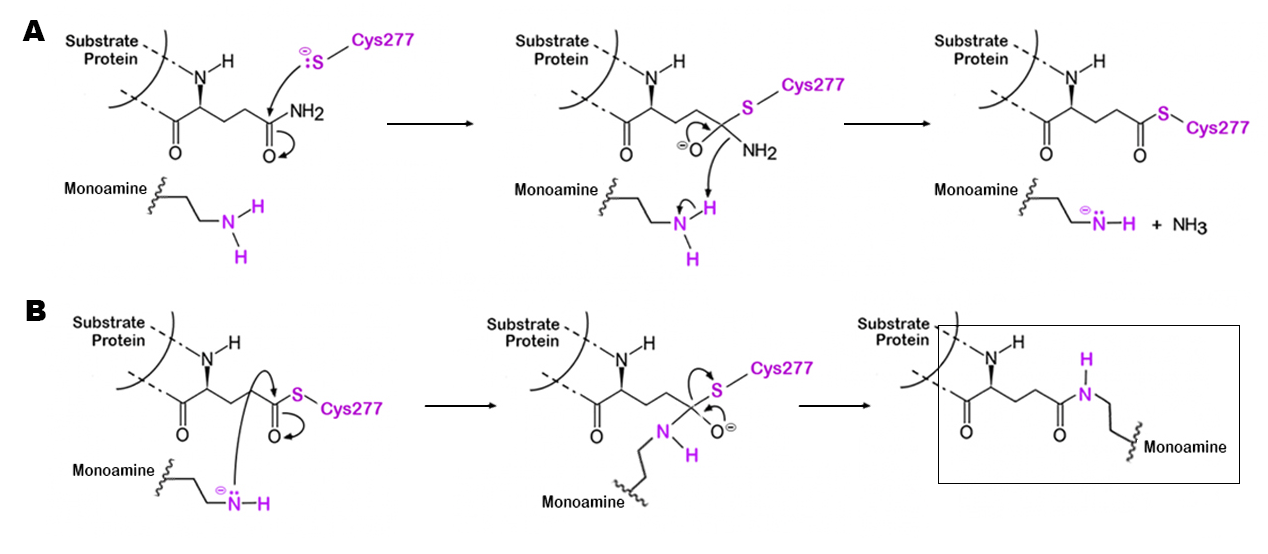

Fig. 1 Mechanism for Protein Monoaminylation
Monoaminylation is a two step, Ca2+-dependent reaction in which TGM2 catalyzes the covalent attachment of a monoamine (ie., dopamine, serotonin, histamine) onto the glutamine residue of a substrate protein. (A) The catalytic cysteine residue (Cys277) of TGM2 facilitates an initial acyl transfer reaction, which is ultimately followed by isopeptide bond formation (B). Common substrate proteins include Histone H3, small GTPases (RhoA, Rab3a), and extracellular matrix proteins (fibronectin).

When intracellular Ca^{2+} and monoamine concentrations are sufficient, TGM2-catalyzed monoaminylation of substrate proteins can occur. First, the catalytic cysteine residue (Cys277) within the TGM2 active site nucleophilically attacks the 𝛾-carboxamido group of the glutamine residue in an acyl transfer reaction (Fig. 1A), forming a thioester intermediate and releasing one molecule of ammonia (NH_{3}) as a result. Next, the deprotonated primary amine of the monoamine substrate nucleophilically attacks the 𝛾-thioester group of the intermediate, forming a stable isopeptide bond and ultimately releasing the enzyme (Fig. 1B).

== Functions ==
=== Histone Monoaminylation ===
With the discovery of histone monoaminylation in 2019, monoaminylation thus entered into the complex and ever-growing field of epigenetics, posing as a novel set of dynamic regulatory mechanisms. To date, histone H3 is the only histone protein known to undergo monoaminylation modifications, and such modifications have only been reported for glutamine position 5 (Gln5) of histone H3 (hereafter referred to as H3Q5). Thus, histone monoaminylation currently refers to the covalent addition of monoamines to glutamine at position 5 (Gln5) of histone H3. Histone serotonylation remains the most widely reported histone monoaminylation modification to date, though both histone dopaminylation and histone histaminylation have also been reported.

Histone monoaminylation modifications are associated with a number of regulatory effects, no two of which appear to be the same. H3Q5-serotonylation (H3Q5ser) has been reported in a wide range of tissues and cell types, including serotonergic neurons of the dorsal raphe nucleus, astrocytes of the olfactory bulb, the inferior alveolar nerve (ie., of the lip and lower jaw), placenta, ependymomas (brain cancers), pancreatic ductal adenocarcinoma (PDAC) tissues, cancer-associated fibroblasts, hepatocellular carcinoma (HCC), and neutrophils. By comparison, H3Q5-dopaminylation (H3Q5dop) has remained a far less explored topic since its discovery in 2020. Nevertheless, H3Q5dop has been reported in dopaminergic neurons of the nucleus accumbens, the ventral tegmental area (VTA), and the amygdala. H3Q5-histaminylation (H3Q5his) remains the most recent (ie., 2025) and thus least reported histone monoaminylation of all, which has been observed within histaminergic neurons of the posterior hypothalamic tuberomammillary nucleus (TMN), and experimentally in vitro using HeLa cells. Data as to the effects of H3Q5ser, H3Q5dop, and H3Q5his are all displayed in detail within the table below:

Monoaminylation	Tissue (or Cell) Type	Modification	Biological Function	References
Serotonylation	Dorsal Raphe Nucleus (Serotonergic neurons)	H3K4me3Q5ser	High levels induce chronic stress-related gene expression programs and attenuate behavioral resilience to stressful stimuli	(Al-Kachak et al., 2024)
Serotonylation	Olfactory bulb (Astrocytes)	H3Q5ser	Regulates olfactory sensory processing by promoting astrocytic GABA release	(Sardar et al., 2023)
Serotonylation	Inferior Alveolar Nerve (ie., of the lip and lower jaw)	H3Q5ser	Promotes sensory neuron regeneration after inferior alveolar nerve transection, enhancing sensory recovery	(Mao et al., 2025)
Serotonylation	Placenta	H3Q5ser	Significantly contributes to developmental gene expression programs in placenta, impacting key neurodevelopmental transcriptional networks in the offspring brain	(Chan et al., 2024)
Serotonylation	Ependymomas (Serotonergic neurons)	H3Q5ser	Promotes ependymoma tumorigenesis by dysregulating the expression of a core set of developmental transcription factors	(Chen et al., 2024)
Serotonylation	Pancreatic Ductal Adenocarcinoma (PDAC) Tissues	H3K4me3Q5ser	Promotes pancreatic cancer progression by upregulating SCD and remodeling lipid metabolism	(Lin et al., 2025)
Serotonylation	Cancer-associated fibroblasts (CAFs)	H3Q5ser	Enhances colorectal cancer (CRC) proliferation and invasiveness by triggering a pro-inflammatory phenotype in CAFs	(Ling et al., 2024)
Serotonylation	Hepatocellular Carcinoma (HCC)	H3Q5ser	Promotes HCC tumor progression by increasing chromatin accessibility, leading to increased MYC transcriptional activity	(Dong et al., 2025)
Serotonylation	Neutrophils	H3Q5ser	Induces the formation of neutrophil extracellular traps (NETs) in the liver, leading to metastases in neuroendocrine (NE) cancers	(Liu et al., 2025)
Serotonylation	Rostral Ventrolateral Medulla (RVLM), Raphe Nuclei	H3K4me3Q5ser	Delays ejaculation by recruiting MZF1 to the DRD4 promoter, upregulating DRD4 expression	(Gao et al., 2023)
Dopaminylation	Nucleus Accumbens (NAc)	H3Q5dop	Promotes cocaine-seeking behavior and regulates cocaine-induced gene expression programs	(Stewart et al., 2023)
Dopaminylation	Ventral Tegmental Area (VTA)	H3Q5dop	Promotes heroin-seeking behavior and regulates gene expression programs associated with heroin abstinence	(Fulton et al., 2022)
Dopaminylation	Amygdala	H3Q5dop	Modification was identified following early-life stressful social experience (SSE) in rat pups	(Rajan et al., 2023)
Histaminylation	Posterior Hypothalamic Tuberomammillary Nucleus (TMN)	H3Q5his	Diurnally rhythmic expression in the brain contributes to circadian gene expression and behavior	(Zheng et al., 2025)

Combinatory effects between monoaminylation and other histone modifications have been reported. Herein, low levels of trimethylation and serotonylation of histone H3 at lysine position 4 (H3K4) and glutamine position 5 (H3Q5), respectively (ie., H3K4me3Q5ser), in the dorsal raphe nucleus led to depressive symptoms in both male and female mice exposed to chronic stress. Behavioral outcomes associated with H3K4me3Q5ser depletion were corrected by treatment with serotonin-associated antidepressants, thus evidencing such antidepressants as sufficient to attenuate stress-mediated gene expression and behavioral dysregulation. Interestingly, corresponding patterns of H3K4me3Q5ser depletion were observed in the brains of major depressive disorder (MDD) patients on vs. off antidepressants at their time of death, thus evidencing a neurotransmission-independent role for serotonin in mediating both stress-associated and anti-depressant-associated transcriptional plasticity and behavioral outcomes.

Similarly, low levels of trimethylation and dopaminylation of histone H3 at lysine position 4 (H3K4) and glutamine position 5 (H3Q5) in the amygdala led to failure in novel odor recognition for rat pups undergoing novel odor preference testing. However, the authors of this study omit whether such modifications were in fact detected concurrently (ie., H3K4me3Q5dop). Nevertheless, scent recognition testing serves as a critical methodology for evaluating memory, cognitive function, and sensory perception in rodent models, and thus represents an important mechanism for evaluating changes in neurotransmission and epigenetic regulation in response to environmental conditions such as stress. Herein, failure to recognize novel odor was reportedly linked to increased dopamine transmission, decreased levels of TGM2, and increased histone trimethylation (H3K4me3) and dopaminylation (H3Q5dop) in the amygdala following exposure to early-life stressful social experience (SSE). It remains unclear whether the reported fluctuations in TGM2 levels could be attributed to changes in TGM2 expression levels or changes in TGM2 activity levels. Ambiguity aside, this data provides useful insight, as early-life adversity paradigms appear sufficient for reconfiguration of epigenetic signatures within the limbic system, thereby establishing stable, differential epigenetic programs which may contribute to lifelong susceptibility for affective psychopathologies (ie., major depressive disorder, bipolar disorder, anxiety disorders).

== See also ==
- Histone Monoaminylation
- Dopaminylation
- Serotonylation
- Histaminylation
