= Histaminylation =

Post-translational modification

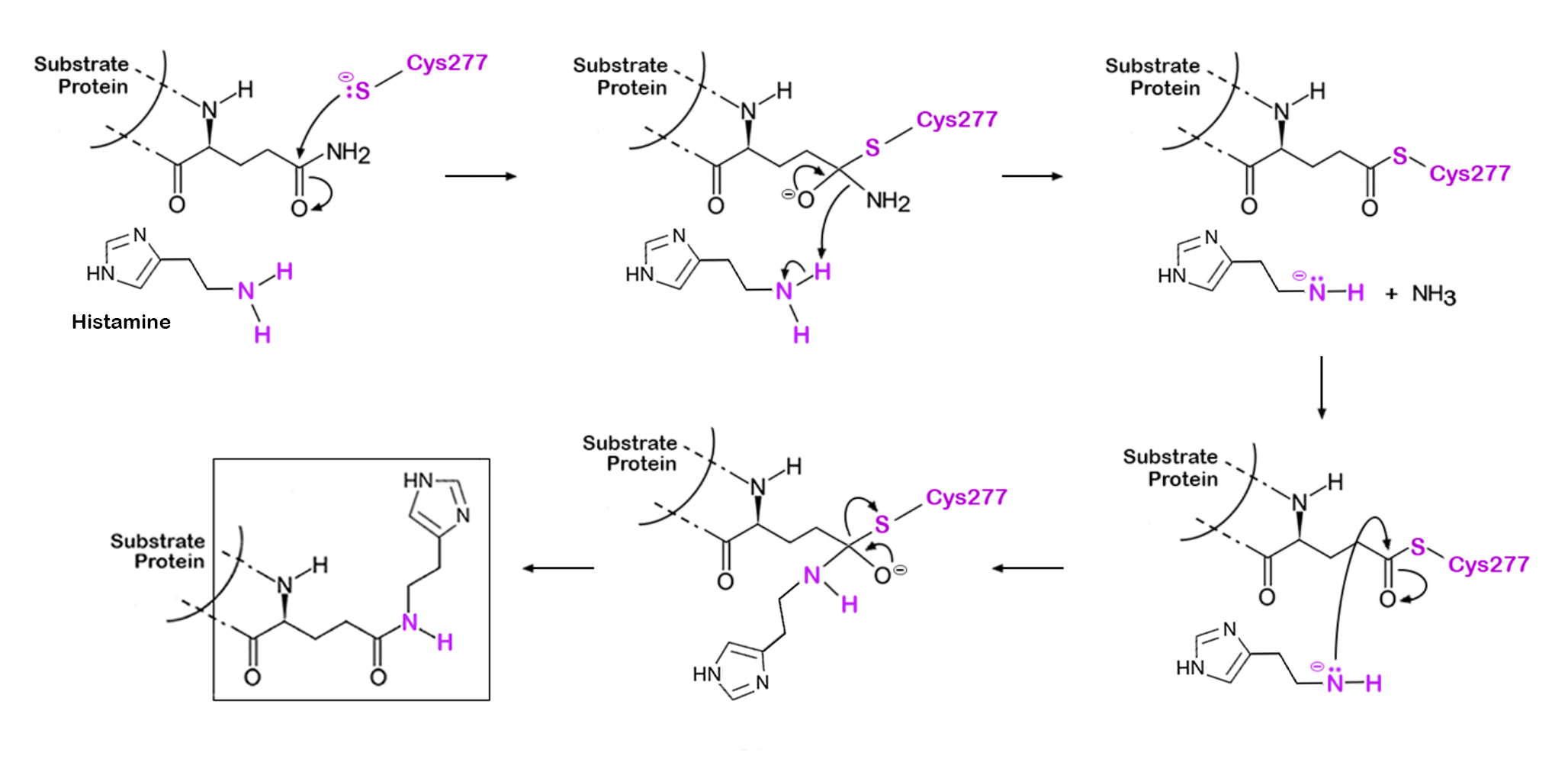
- Post-translational modification in which histamine is covalently attached to glutamine residues via reactions catalyzed by TGM2.

Biochemical Reaction
- Part of: Cell
- Located: Nucleus, Cytoplasm
- Category: Post-translational modification
- Type: Monoaminylation

Central Functions
- Regulation of Sleep-Wake Cycles Involved in CLOCK-BMAL1 Signaling

Key Enzymes
- TGM2

Discovered
2012	Jakob Vowinckel & Colleagues; Discover protein histaminylation as a novel post-translational modification
2025	Qingfei Zheng & Colleagues; Discover histone histaminylation as a novel post-translational modification
2026	Xingyu Ma & Colleagues; Develop a new Nτ-PH probe for detecting protein histaminylation
2026	Xingyu Ma & Colleagues; Identify 496 histaminylated proteins between two cancer cell lines
- Category

Protein histaminylation refers to the post-translational modification in which histamine is covalently attached to glutamine residues via transamidation. Monoaminylation itself refers to the overall class of post-translational modifications involving monoamines; however, these reactions are further classified by the individual monoamine reactant they describe (i.e., dopaminylation, serotonylation, histaminylation).

Histaminylation has been reported for both histone and non-histone protein substrates, and thus represents a distinct neuroepigenetic and neuroproteomic regulatory mechanism with various implications in health and disease. Recent studies have revealed a critical role for histone histaminylation in regulating core components of the sleep-wake cycle and circadian rhythm in the brain.

Despite its discovery in 2012, research as to the direct links between protein histaminylation and disease has seldom occurred and its functions are still largely unknown. Nevertheless, protein histaminylation has been reported in a number of cells and tissues, including mast cells, histaminergic neurons of the posterior hypothalamic tuberomammillary nucleus (TMN), colorectal cancer cell lines, and stomach cancer cell lines.

The histaminylation proteome has remained largely unexplored due to a lack of efficient pan-specific antibodies targeting histaminylated glutamine. To date, notable protein histaminylation substrates include several G proteins (Gαq, Gαo1, Cdc42), fibrinogen, and the histone proteins H2A, H2B, H3, and H4.

In early 2026, a recently developed Nτ-propargylated histamine (Nτ-PH) probe was successfully applied in chemical proteomic profiling of the histaminylation proteome in cancer cells. Herein, authors present emerging evidence suggesting that over 400 proteins possessed histaminylation sites in a colorectal cancer cell line (i.e., HCT 116 cells), and over 200 proteins were identified as targets of histaminylation in a stomach cancer cell line (i.e., AGS cells). The advent of the Nτ-PH probe is anticipated to enable a more extensive investigation of histaminylation in 2026, and is expected to facilitate a substantial increase in studies on the functions of histaminylation in both health and disease.

== Identification ==
Protein monoaminylation was first identified in 1957 by Heinrich Waelsch and colleagues at Columbia University. After discovering that primary amines could be covalently incorporated into proteins via transamidation at glutamine residues, the group went on to uncover the enzyme catalyzing these reactions, effectively naming it "transglutaminase" after its function.

Despite its discovery in the mid-twentieth century, protein monoaminylation was not investigated as a post-translational modification until 2003, when Diego Walther and colleagues at the Max-Planck-Institute for Molecular Genetics revealed that serotonylation of small GTPases mediates ⍺-granule release during the activation and aggregation of platelets. Almost a decade later, Jackob Vowinckel and colleagues at the Max-Planck-Institute for Molecular Genetics identified histaminylation as a novel post-translational modification implicated in G-protein signaling.

Notably, monoaminylation was not uncovered as an epigenetic regulatory mechanism until 2019, when Lorna Farrelly and colleagues at the Icahn School of Medicine reported the H3Q5-serotonylation (H3Q5ser) modification for the first time. Later, in 2020, the H3Q5-dopaminylation (H3Q5dop) modification was identified in the striatum by Ashley Lepack and colleagues at the Icahn School of Medicine. Five years later, Qingfei Zheng and colleagues at Ohio State University discovered the H3Q5-histaminylation (H3Q5his) modification for the first time within histaminergic neurons of the posterior hypothalamic tuberomammillary nucleus (TMN).

Recently, in early 2026, Xingyu Ma and colleagues at Purdue University developed a Nτ-propargylated histamine (Nτ-PH) probe and successfully identified over 400 histaminylated proteins in a colorectal cancer cell line (i.e., HCT 116 cells), and over 200 histaminylated proteins in stomach cancer cell line (i.e., AGS cells). Of these proteins, 104 were found in both cancer cell lines.

== Mechanism ==
Histaminylation is catalyzed by transglutaminase 2 (TGM2) in a calcium-dependent manner, and relies upon the intracellular bioavailability of histamine substrates. Generally, protein histaminylation occurs in the cytoplasm; however, histone histaminylation only occurs within the nucleus. Nevertheless, the mechanism for TGM2-catalyzed histaminylation is identical for both histone and non-histone proteins alike.

Structurally, Ca^{2+} binds directly to TGM2 itself and not to the substrate molecule. Once Ca^{2+} binds to TGM2, a 4 nm relaxation about the major axis of the protein exposes the active site to available substrates. The active site itself is composed of a well conserved catalytic triad (Cys277–His335–Asp358) situated within a substrate binding channel, which is bordered by two conserved residues (Trp241 and Trp332) that facilitate catalysis through stabilization of the transition state.

Once intracellular Ca^{2+} binds to TGM2 and exposes the substrate binding channel, the glutamine residue of a substrate protein (i.e., histone H3, Cdc42) is free to enter the enzyme active site. As a transamidation reaction, the mechanism for protein histaminylation can be summarized in two parts: an initial thioester formation, followed by isopeptide bond formation.

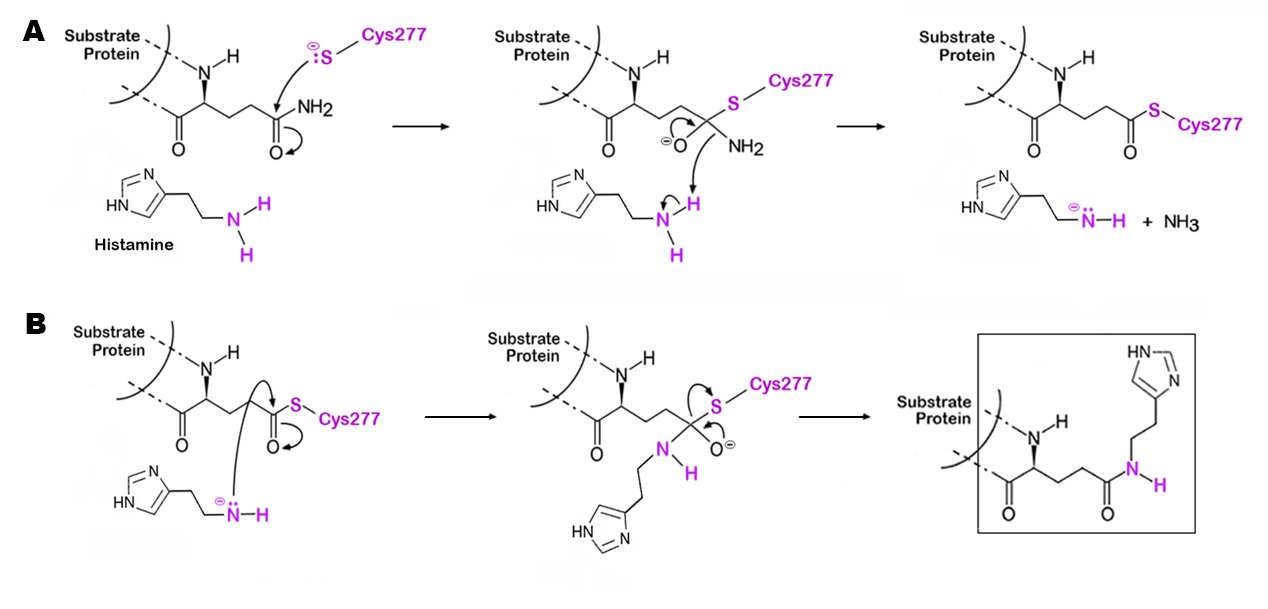

Fig. 1 Mechanism for Protein Histaminylation
Monoaminylation is a two step, Ca^{2+}-dependent reaction in which TGM2 catalyzes the covalent attachment of histamine onto the glutamine residue of a substrate protein. (A) The catalytic cysteine residue (Cys277) of TGM2 facilitates an initial acyl transfer reaction, which is ultimately followed by isopeptide bond formation (B).

When intracellular Ca^{2+} and histamine concentrations are sufficient, TGM2-catalyzed histaminylation of substrate proteins can occur. First, the catalytic cysteine residue (Cys277) in the TGM2 active site nucleophilically attacks the 𝛾-carboxamido group of the glutamine residue in an acyl transfer reaction (Fig. 1A), forming a thioester intermediate and releasing one molecule of ammonia (NH_{3}) as a result. Next, the deprotonated primary amine of the histamine substrate nucleophilically attacks the 𝛾-thioester group of the intermediate, forming a stable isopeptide bond and ultimately releasing the enzyme (Fig. 1B).

== Functions ==
=== Histone Histaminylation ===
With the discovery of histone monoaminylation in 2019, monoaminylation thus entered into the complex and ever-growing field of epigenetics, posing as a novel set of dynamic regulatory mechanisms. Histone serotonylation remains the most widely reported histone monoaminylation modification to date, though both histone dopaminylation and histone histaminylation have also been reported. To date, histone H3 is the only histone protein known to undergo all three monoaminylation modifications, which have only been reported for glutamine position 5 (Gln5) (hereafter referred to as H3Q5). Thus, histone monoaminylation typically refers to the covalent addition of monoamines to glutamine at position 5 (Gln5) of histone H3.

However, a recent study from Xingyu Ma and colleagues at Purdue University revealed that histaminylation also occurs for histone H2A, histone H2AX, histone H2B, and histone H4. Herein, authors report five primary histaminylation sites for histone H2A, namely H2AQ24his, H2AQ84his, H2AQ104his, H2AQ122his, and H2AQ137his. Five equivalent histaminylation sites were also identified for histone H2AX, the crucial variant histone H2A which is known to replace conventional H2A in a subset of nucleosomes. Two additional histaminylation sites were also reported for H2B and H4, namely H2BQ47his and H4Q27his. Although the functional roles of these 12 histone histaminylation modifications have not been identified yet, the development of the Nτ-PH histaminylation probe is expected to facilitate a substantial increase in research as to the functions of histone histaminylation in both health and disease.

Generally, histone monoaminylation modifications are associated with a wide number of regulatory effects, no two of which appear to be the same. Histone H3 histaminylation (H3Q5his) expression is enriched at the site of histamine production within the brain, namely within histaminergic neurons of the posterior hypothalamic tuberomammillary nucleus (TMN). Herein, diurnal expression of H3Q5his is known to modulate circadian rhythms within the brain, where it is a contributing factor in the regulation of circadian gene expression and sleep-wake cycle behaviors. Interestingly, trimethylation and histaminylation of histone H3 at lysine position 4 (H3K4) and glutamine position 5 (H3Q5; together H3K4me3Q5his) have also been observed to have rhythmic expression within the TMN. Expression of H3K4me3Q5his in the TMN was reportedly highest during the active phase of the sleep-wake cycle (ie., in mice), with such levels thereafter decreasing dramatically during the inactive phase. Details as to the reported effects of H3Q5his and H3K4me3Q5his are displayed within the table below (Table 1).

Monoaminylation	Tissue	Modification	Biological Function	References
Histaminylation	Tuberomammillary Nucleus (TMN)	H3K4me3Q5his	Displays diurnally rhythmic expression in brain; attenuates binding of WDR5 to H3	(Zheng et al., 2025)
Histaminylation	Tuberomammillary Nucleus (TMN)	H3Q5his	Diurnally rhythmic expression in the brain contributes to circadian gene expression and behavior	(Zheng et al., 2025)

H3K4me3Q5his expression dynamics seem to directly oppose patterns of H3K4 methylation previously implicated in circadian gene expression programs; however, loss of H3Q5 monoaminylation significantly disrupts normal patterns of circadian gene expression. Interestingly, based on a series of biochemical and structural assessments, H3K4me3Q5his was found to attenuate WDR5 complex binding to the tail of histone H3. H3K4me3Q5his was also found to inhibit the H3K4 methyltransferase activities of MLL1-4 and SETD1A/B complexes, all of which require WDR5 as a co-factor. Taken together, H3K4me3Q5his represses H3K4 methylation through antagonization of WDR5; however, the exact mechanism describing these unfavorable interactions has yet to be described.

In addition to H3K4me3Q5his, H3K4me3Q5ser has also been shown to be involved in regulation of the circadian rhythm, showing similar patterns of diurnal expression within the tuberomammillary nucleus (TMN). Significant overlap between both H3K4me3Q5his and H3K4me3Q5ser expression in the TMN were reported during the active phase of the sleep-wake cycle; however, only H3K4me3Q5ser levels were found to taper towards the end of the active phase. Loss of H3K4me3Q5ser at this stage correlated with a reduction in WDR5, the activity of which also peaks during the height of the active phase. Unsurprisingly, rhythmic patterns of H3K4me3Q5his and H3K4me3Q5ser (along with changes in WDR5 binding) correlate with diurnal gene expression programs associated with the CLOCK-BMAL1 transcription factor complex. CLOCK-BMAL1 functions as a molecular oscillator, where it serves as the principal molecular machinery driving the mammalian circadian rhythm (or clock) and regulating 24-hour cycles of gene expression. H3K4me3Q5his expression within the TMN exhibited robust oscillations relative to H3K4me3 dynamics, peaking during active wake phases during the direct transcriptional governance of CLOCK-BMAL1. These observations suggest a critical role for H3 monoaminylation dynamics in dictating WDR5 recruitment to CLOCK-BMAL1-target loci, to control H3K4 methylation states and modulate circadian gene expression programs.

== See also ==
- Monoaminylation
- Histone Monoaminylation
- Dopaminylation
- Serotonylation
- Histamine
