= Serotonylation =

Post-translational modification

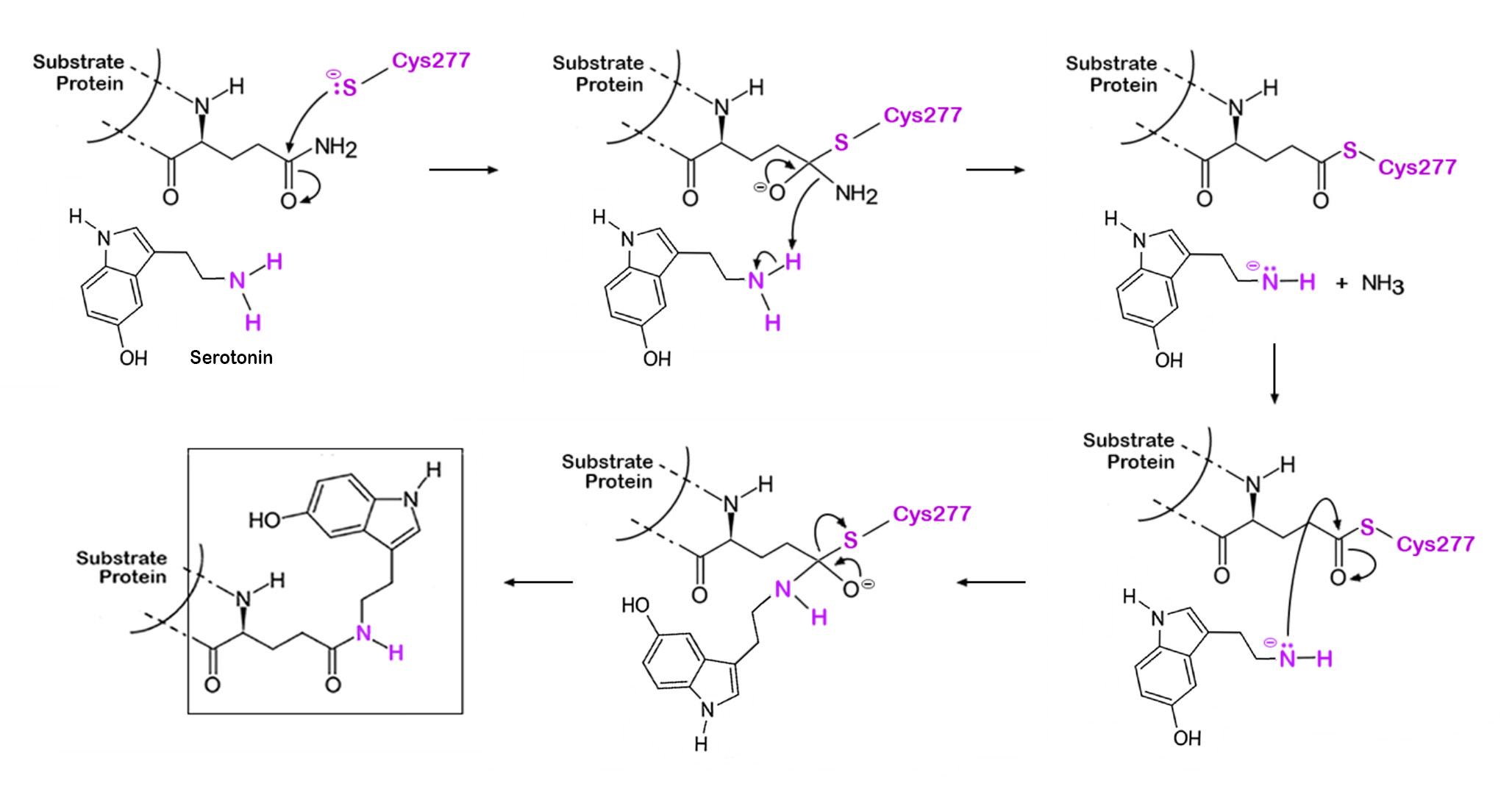
- Post-translational modification in which serotonin is covalently attached to glutamine residues via reactions catalyzed by TGM2.

Biochemical Reaction
- Part of: Cell, Extracellular Matrix
- Located: Nucleus, Cytoplasm
- Category: Post-translational modification
- Type: Monoaminylation

Central Functions
- Epigenetic Regulatory Functions Neuroepigenetic & Neuroproteomic Regulation Placental Signaling & Embryonic Development Modulation of Synaptic Activity

Key Enzymes
- TGM2

Discovered
2003	Diego Walther & Colleagues; Discovered protein serotonylation for the first time
2011	Diego Walther & Colleagues; Proposed monoaminylation as a novel set of post-translational modifications
2019	Lorna Farrelly & Colleagues; Discovered histone serotonylation as a novel post-translational modification
2021	Di Yi & Colleagues; Uncovered link between protein serotonylation and cancer for the first time
- Category

Protein serotonylation refers to the post-translational modification in which the monoamine serotonin is covalently attached to glutamine residues on substrate proteins via transamidation. Serotonylation is a type of monoaminylation, which itself refers to the overall class of post-translational modifications involving monoamines. However, monoaminylation reactions are further classified by the individual monoamine reactant they describe (ie., serotonylation, dopaminylation, histaminylation).

Serotonylation has been reported for both histone and non-histone protein substrates, and thus represents a distinct neuroepigenetic and neuroproteomic regulatory mechanism with various implications in health and disease. Since 2003, multiple studies have revealed the critical role of serotonylation in mediating a wide range of physiological processes, both in the nervous system and beyond. Serotonylation is known to contribute to several significant diseases, including neuropsychiatric disorders such as depression and schizophrenia, as well as a variety of cancers.

To date, notable protein serotonylation substrates include several metabolic enzymes (GAPDH, mTOR), Rab GTPases (Rab3a, Rab27a), Rho GTPases (RhoA, Rac1, Cdc42), proteins involved in muscle contractility (⍺-actinin, SERCA2a), extracellular matrix proteins (fibronectin), neural surface proteins, and Ras, as well as the histone protein H3.

Serotonylation has been reported in various cell types and tissues, including both serotonergic and dopaminergic neurons, enterochromaffin cells, cancer-associated fibroblasts, pancreatic 𝛽-cells, CD8+ T cells, pulmonary endothelial cells, platelets, neutrophils, mammary epithelial cells, vascular smooth muscle, and cells of the intestines. Serotonylation is known to influence both tumorigenesis and cancer metastasis, and has been implicated in several types of cancer, including colorectal cancer, neuroendocrine prostate cancer, pancreatic cancer, hepatocellular carcinoma, and ependymomas (brain cancer).

== Identification ==
Protein monoaminylation was first discovered in 1957 by Heinrich Waelsch and colleagues at Columbia University. After demonstrating the incorporation of monoamines into proteins via transamidation at glutamine residues, the group went on to uncover the enzyme catalyzing these reactions, effectively naming it "transglutaminase" after its function.

Despite its discovery in the mid-twentieth century, protein monoaminylation was not investigated as a post-translational modification until 2003, when Diego Walther and colleagues at the Max-Planck-Institute for Molecular Genetics revealed that serotonylation of small GTPases mediates ⍺-granule release during the activation and aggregation of platelets.

Notably, monoaminylation itself was not uncovered as an epigenetic regulatory mechanism until 2019, when Lorna Farrelly and colleagues at the Icahn School of Medicine reported the H3Q5-serotonylation (H3Q5ser) modification for the first time. Thereafter, in 2021, Di Ye and colleagues at Sichuan University revealed mTOR-serotonylation as part of a novel feedback mechanism within the tryptophan pathway in colon cancer, demonstrating a link between protein serotonylation and cancer for the first time.

== Mechanism ==
Serotonylation is catalyzed by transglutaminase 2 (TGM2) in a calcium-dependent manner, and relies upon the intracellular bioavailability of serotonin substrates. Generally, protein serotonylation occurs in the cytoplasm; however, histone serotonylation only occurs within the nucleus. Nevertheless, the mechanism for TGM2-catalyzed serotonylation is identical for both histone and non-histone proteins alike.

Structurally, Ca^{2+} binds directly to TGM2 itself and not to the substrate molecule. Once Ca^{2+} binds to TGM2, a 4 nm relaxation about the major axis of the protein exposes the active site to available substrates. The active site itself is composed of a well conserved catalytic triad (Cys277–His335–Asp358) situated within a substrate binding channel, which is bordered by two conserved residues (Trp241 and Trp332) that facilitate catalysis through stabilization of the transition state. Once intracellular Ca^{2+} binds to TGM2 and exposes the substrate binding channel, the glutamine residue of a substrate protein (ie., histone H3, RhoA) is free to enter the enzyme active site. As a transamidation reaction, the mechanism for protein serotonylation can be summarized in two parts: an initial thioester formation, followed by isopeptide bond formation.

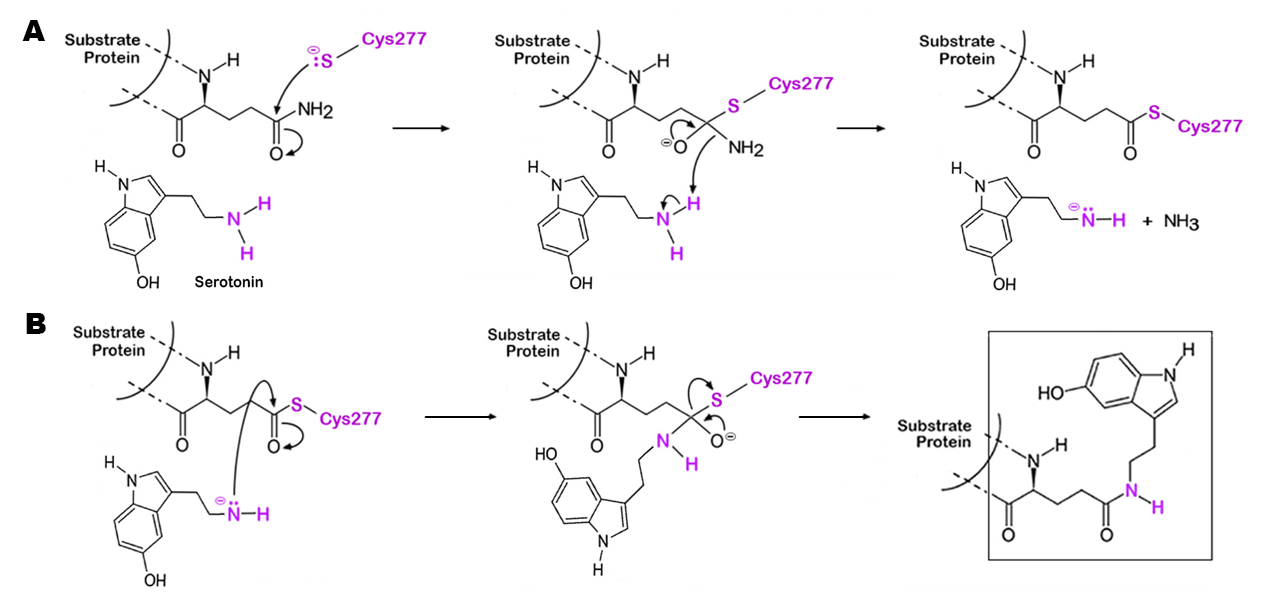

Fig. 1 Mechanism for Protein Serotonylation
Serotonylation is a two step, Ca^{2+}-dependent reaction in which TGM2 catalyzes the covalent attachment of a serotonin molecule onto the glutamine residue of a substrate protein. (A) The catalytic cysteine residue (Cys277) of TGM2 facilitates an initial acyl transfer reaction, which is ultimately followed by isopeptide bond formation (B). Common substrate proteins include Histone H3, small GTPases (RhoA, Rab3a), and extracellular matrix proteins (fibronectin).

When intracellular Ca^{2+} and serotonin concentrations are sufficient, TGM2-catalyzed serotonylation of substrate proteins can occur. First, the catalytic cysteine residue (Cys277) in the TGM2 active site nucleophilically attacks the 𝛾-carboxamido group of the glutamine residue in an acyl transfer reaction (Fig. 1A), forming a thioester intermediate and releasing one molecule of ammonia (NH_{3}) as a result. Next, the deprotonated primary amine of the serotonin molecule nucleophilically attacks the 𝛾-thioester group of the intermediate, forming a stable isopeptide bond and ultimately releasing the enzyme (Fig. 1B).

== Function ==
=== Histone Serotonylation ===
With the discovery of histone monoaminylation in 2019, monoaminylation thus entered into the complex and ever-growing field of epigenetics, posing as a novel set of dynamic regulatory mechanisms. To date, histone H3 is the only histone protein known to undergo monoaminylation modifications, and such modifications have only been reported for glutamine position 5 (Gln5) of histone H3 (hereafter referred to as H3Q5). Thus, histone monoaminylation currently refers to the covalent addition of monoamines to glutamine at position 5 (Gln5) of histone H3. Histone serotonylation remains the most widely reported histone monoaminylation modification to date, though both histone dopaminylation and histone histaminylation have also been reported.

Histone monoaminylation modifications are associated with a number of regulatory effects, no two of which appear to be the same. H3Q5-serotonylation (H3Q5ser) has been reported in a wide range of tissues and cell types, including serotonergic neurons of the dorsal raphe nucleus, astrocytes of the olfactory bulb, the inferior alveolar nerve (ie., of the lip and lower jaw), placenta, ependymomas (brain cancers), pancreatic ductal adenocarcinoma (PDAC) tissues, cancer-associated fibroblasts, hepatocellular carcinoma (HCC), and neutrophils. Combinatory effects between monoaminylation and other histone modifications have been reported. Herein, low levels of trimethylation and serotonylation of histone H3 at lysine position 4 (H3K4) and glutamine position 5 (H3Q5), respectively (ie., H3K4me3Q5ser), in the dorsal raphe nucleus led to depressive symptoms in both male and female mice exposed to chronic stress. Behavioral outcomes associated with H3K4me3Q5ser depletion were corrected by treatment with serotonin-associated antidepressants, thus evidencing such antidepressants as sufficient to attenuate stress-mediated gene expression and behavioral dysregulation. Interestingly, corresponding patterns of H3K4me3Q5ser depletion were observed in the brains of major depressive disorder (MDD) patients on vs. off antidepressants at their time of death, thus evidencing a neurotransmission-independent role for serotonin in mediating both stress-associated and anti-depressant-associated transcriptional plasticity and behavioral outcomes. Data as to the effects of H3Q5ser and H3K4me3Q5ser are displayed in detail within the table below:

Monoaminylation	Tissue (or Cell) Type	Modification	Biological Function	References
Serotonylation	Dorsal Raphe Nucleus (Serotonergic neurons)	H3K4me3Q5ser	High levels induce chronic stress-related gene expression programs and attenuate behavioral resilience to stressful stimuli	(Al-Kachak et al., 2024)
Serotonylation	Olfactory bulb (Astrocytes)	H3Q5ser	Regulates olfactory sensory processing by promoting astrocytic GABA release	(Sardar et al., 2023)
Serotonylation	Inferior Alveolar Nerve (ie., of the lip and lower jaw)	H3Q5ser	Promotes sensory neuron regeneration after inferior alveolar nerve transection, enhancing sensory recovery	(Mao et al., 2025)
Serotonylation	Placenta	H3Q5ser	Significantly contributes to developmental gene expression programs in placenta, impacting key neurodevelopmental transcriptional networks in the offspring brain	(Chan et al., 2024)
Serotonylation	Ependymomas (Serotonergic neurons)	H3Q5ser	Promotes ependymoma tumorigenesis by dysregulating the expression of a core set of developmental transcription factors	(Chen et al., 2024)
Serotonylation	Pancreatic Ductal Adenocarcinoma (PDAC) Tissues	H3K4me3Q5ser	Promotes pancreatic cancer progression by upregulating SCD and remodeling lipid metabolism	(Lin et al., 2025)
Serotonylation	Cancer-associated fibroblasts (CAFs)	H3Q5ser	Enhances colorectal cancer (CRC) proliferation and invasiveness by triggering a pro-inflammatory phenotype in CAFs	(Ling et al., 2024)
Serotonylation	Hepatocellular Carcinoma (HCC)	H3Q5ser	Promotes HCC tumor progression by increasing chromatin accessibility, leading to increased MYC transcriptional activity	(Dong et al., 2025)
Serotonylation	Neutrophils	H3Q5ser	Induces the formation of neutrophil extracellular traps (NETs) in the liver, leading to metastases in neuroendocrine (NE) cancers	(Liu et al., 2025)
Serotonylation	Rostral Ventrolateral Medulla (RVLM), Raphe Nuclei	H3K4me3Q5ser	Delays ejaculation by recruiting MZF1 to the DRD4 promoter, upregulating DRD4 expression	(Gao et al., 2023)

== See also ==
- Monoaminylation
- Histone Monoaminylation
- Dopaminylation
- Histaminylation
