= Macoilin =

Protein found in humans

MACO1

Identifiers
- Aliases: MACO1, MACOILIN, transmembrane protein 57, macoilin 1, TMEM57
- External IDs: OMIM: 610301; MGI: 1913396; GeneCards: MACO1

Gene location (Human)
Chr.	Chromosome 1 (human)
Band	1p36.11|1p36.11	Start	25,430,858 bp
Band	1p36.11|1p36.11	End	25,500,209 bp

Gene location (Mouse)
Chr.	Chromosome 4 (mouse)
Band	4 D3|4 67.11 cM	Start	134,530,070 bp
Band	4 D3|4 67.11 cM	End	134,580,656 bp
RNA expression pattern
Bgee	Human / Mouse (ortholog); Top expressed in: tendon of biceps brachii; ganglionic eminence; buccal mucosa cell; Skeletal muscle tissue of biceps brachii; body of pancreas; gastrocnemius muscle; islet of Langerhans; muscle of thigh; Achilles tendon; liver / Top expressed in: superior cervical ganglion; Rostral migratory stream; hand; Gonadal ridge; spermatocyte; zygote; ganglionic eminence; otolith organ; lacrimal gland; utricle; More reference expression data
BioGPS	n/a
Gene ontology
Molecular function	molecular function; microtubule binding; actin filament binding
Cellular component	integral component of membrane; neuron projection; axon; cell projection; synapse; nuclear membrane; neuron projection terminus; membrane; nucleus; endoplasmic reticulum; rough endoplasmic reticulum membrane
Biological process	brain development; neuronal signal transduction; chemotaxis
Sources:Amigo / QuickGO
Orthologs
Databases	NCBI: entry; OMA: entry
Species	Human	Mouse
Entrez	55219	66146
Ensembl	ENSG00000204178	ENSMUSG00000028826
UniProt	Q8N5G2	Q7TQE6
RefSeq (mRNA)	NM_001282564; NM_018202	NM_025382; NM_001355499; NM_001355500; NM_001355501
RefSeq (protein)	NP_001269493; NP_060672	NP_079658; NP_001342428; NP_001342429; NP_001342430
Location (UCSC)	Chr 1: 25.43 – 25.5 Mb	Chr 4: 134.53 – 134.58 Mb
PubMed search
- Wikidata
View/Edit Human	View/Edit Mouse

Macoilin is a protein that in humans is encoded by the MACO1 gene (previously TMEM57). This protein is involved in regulating neuronal activity.

== See also ==
- Endoplasmic reticulum protein 57 (Erp57)
- Vicinal (chemistry)
