= ZED1227 =

Chemical compound

Legal status
- Legal status: Investigational

Identifiers
- IUPAC name: Methyl (E,6S)-7-[[1-[2-(2-ethylbutylamino)-2-oxoethyl]-2-oxopyridin-3-yl]amino]-6-[(1-methylimidazole-4-carbonyl)amino]-7-oxohept-2-enoate
- CAS Number: 1542132-88-6
- PubChem CID: 168775562
- UNII: T4SR539YKF

Chemical and physical data
- Formula: C_{26}H_{36}N_{6}O_{6}
- Molar mass: 528.610 g·mol^{−1}
- 3D model (JSmol): Interactive image
- SMILES: CCC(CC)CNC(=O)CN1C=CC=C(C1=O)NC(=O)[C@H](CC/C=C/C(=O)OC)NC(=O)C2=CN(C=N2)C
- InChI: InChI=1S/C26H36N6O6/c1-5-18(6-2)14-27-22(33)16-32-13-9-11-20(26(32)37)30-24(35)19(10-7-8-12-23(34)38-4)29-25(36)21-15-31(3)17-28-21/h8-9,11-13,15,17-19H,5-7,10,14,16H2,1-4H3,(H,27,33)(H,29,36)(H,30,35)/b12-8+/t19-/m0/s1; Key:TUGXQJSOJVUJEA-BEBFYNPSSA-N

ZED1227 is a transglutaminase 2 (TG2) inhibitor developed by Zedira GmbH for celiac disease and nonalcoholic steatohepatitis.
