= Ventrolateral medulla =

The ventrolateral medulla, part of the medulla oblongata of the brainstem, plays a major role in regulating arterial blood pressure and breathing. It regulates blood pressure by regulating the activity of the sympathetic nerves that target the heart and peripheral blood vessels.

The ventrolateral medulla consists of a rostral ventrolateral medulla (RVLM) and a caudal ventrolateral medulla (CVLM). Neurons in the RVLM project directly to preganglionic neurons in the spinal cord and maintain tonic activity in the sympathetic vasomotor nerves. This activity is inhibited by GABA output from the CVLM.
