= Posterior nucleus of hypothalamus =

Posterior hypothalamic nucleus
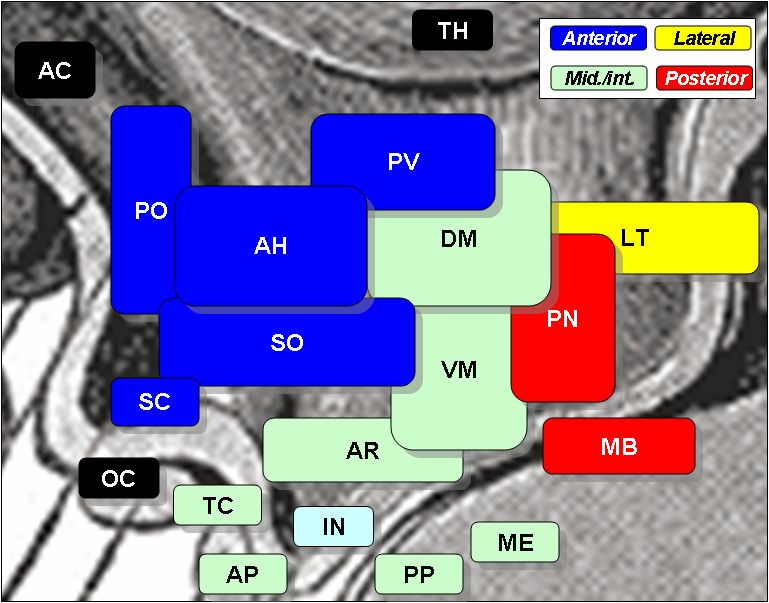
- Posterior nucleus is 'PN', at right, in red.

Details
- Part of: Hypothalamus

Identifiers
- Latin: nucleus posterior hypothalami
- NeuroNames: 420
- NeuroLex ID: birnlex_1463
- TA98: A14.1.08.939
- TA2: 5738
- FMA: 62350

The posterior nucleus of the hypothalamus is one of the many nuclei that make up the hypothalamic region of the brain.

Its functions include elevation of blood pressure, pupillary dilation, and shivering or body heat conservation (thermoregulation). Damage or destruction of this nucleus causes hypothermia. Descending efferents from the nucleus synapse on the sympathetic neurons of the spinal cord, which exist in the thoracic and lumbar regions in the lateral horns. A recent study showed that a subset of neurons in this brain area are involved in the generation of panic-like defensive state in mice.
