= Tuberomammillary nucleus =

Nucleus in the mammalian hypothalamus

- Tuberomammillary nucleus of the mouse brain

Details
- Part of: Hypothalamus

Identifiers
- Latin: nucleus tuberomamillaris
- Acronym: TMN
- NeuroNames: 427
- NeuroLex ID: birnlex_1271
- TA98: A14.1.08.932
- TA2: 5734
- FMA: 62335

The tuberomammillary nucleus (TMN) is a histaminergic nucleus located within the posterior third of the hypothalamus. It is part of the tuber cinereum. It largely consists of histaminergic neurons (i.e. histamine-releasing neurons). It is involved with the control of arousal, learning, memory, sleep and energy balance.

== Efferents ==
The tuberomammillary nucleus is the sole source of histamine pathways in the human brain. The densest axonal projections from the tuberomammillary nucleus are sent to the cerebral cortex, hippocampus, neostriatum, nucleus accumbens, amygdala, and other parts of the hypothalamus. The projections to the cerebral cortex directly increase cortical activation and arousal, and projections to acetylcholinergic neurons of the basal forebrain and dorsal pons do so indirectly, by increasing the release of acetylcholine in the cerebral cortex.
