= Rostral ventrolateral medulla =

Region of the human brain

The rostral ventrolateral medulla (RVLM), also known as the pressor area of the medulla, is a part of the ventrolateral medulla in the brainstem responsible for basal and reflex control of sympathetic activity associated with cardiovascular function. Abnormally elevated sympathetic activity in the RVLM is associated with various cardiovascular diseases, such as heart failure and hypertension. The RVLM is notably involved in the baroreflex.

It receives inhibitory GABAergic input from the caudal ventrolateral medulla (CVLM). The RVLM is a primary regulator of the sympathetic nervous system; it sends catecholaminergic projections to the sympathetic preganglionic neurons in the intermediolateral nucleus of the spinal cord via reticulospinal tract.

Physostigmine, a choline-esterase inhibitor, elevates endogenous levels of acetylcholine and causes a rise in blood pressure by stimulation of the RVLM. Orexinergic neurons from the lateral hypothalamus output in the RVLM.

== See also ==
- Vasomotor center
