= Max Planck Institute for Molecular Genetics =

German research institute

Coordinates: 52°26′40″N 13°16′22″E

The Max Planck Institute for Molecular Genetics (MPIMG) is a research institute for molecular genetics based in Berlin, Germany. It is part of the Max Planck Institute network of the Max Planck Society for the Advancement of Science.

== Departments and research groups ==
- Department of Developmental Genetics (Bernhard Herrmann)
- Department of Genome Regulation (Alexander Meissner)
  - Genome Regulation Group (Alexander Meissner)
  - Stem Cell Chromatin Group (Aydan Bulut-Karslioglu)
  - Lab for Human Brain & Neural Stem Cell Studies (Yechiel Elkabetz)
  - Precision Gene Control group (Denes Hnisz)
  - Cellular Phenotyping Group (Franz-Josef Müller)
- Department of Computational Molecular Biology (Martin Vingron)
  - Transcriptional Regulation Group (Martin Vingron)
  - Mechanisms of Transcriptional Regulation Group (Sebastiaan H. Meijsing)
  - Chromatin Structure and Function Group (Sarah Kinkley)
  - Bioinformatics Group (Ralf Herwig)
  - Research Group Evolutionary Genomics (Peter Arndt)
- Otto Warburg Laboratories
  - Quantitative RNA Biology (Tugce Aktas)
  - Epigenomics (Ho-Ryun Chung)
  - RNA Bioinformatics (Annalisa Marsico)
  - Nascent Transcription & Cell Differentiation (Andreas Mayer)
  - Regulatory Networks in Stem Cells (Edda Schulz)
  - Gene Regulation & System Biology of Cancer (Marie-Laure Yaspo)
  - Cell Signaling Dynamics (Zhike Zi)
- Efficient Algorithms for Omics Data (Knut Reinert)
- Scientific Services
  - Flow Cytometry Facility (Claudia Giesecke-Thiel)
  - Mass Spectrometry Facility (David Meierhofer)
  - Microscopy & Cryo-Electron Microscopy Unit (Thorsten Mielke)
  - Sequencing Core Facility (Bernd Timmermann)
