= Cancer-associated fibroblast =

Tumour-promoting cell type

A cancer-associated fibroblast (CAF) (also known as tumour-associated fibroblast; carcinogenic-associated fibroblast; activated fibroblast) is a cell type within the tumor microenvironment that promotes tumorigenic features by initiating the remodelling of the extracellular matrix or by secreting cytokines. CAFs are a complex and abundant cell type within the tumour microenvironment; the number cannot decrease, as they are unable to undergo apoptosis.

CAFs have been found to be abundant in a tumour stroma. Myofibroblasts and fibroblasts make up CAFs.

The functions of these CAFs have been known to stimulate angiogenesis, supporting the formation of tumours and thus proliferation of cancer cell and metastasis. Cancer cells are usually also drug resistant, which is contributed by CAFs. As such, this interaction is being studied for potential anti-cancer therapy.

Normal fibroblasts aid in the production of components of the extracellular matrix such as collagens, fibres, glycosaminoglycans and glycoproteins and are therefore vital in tissue repair in wound healing.

CAFs however, are derived from either normal fibroblasts, pericytes, smooth muscle cells, fibrocytes or mesenchymal stem cells These CAFs then go on to support tumour growth by secreting growth factors such as Vascular Endothelial Growth Factor (VEGF), Platelet Derived Growth Factor (PDGF) and Fibroblast Growth Factor (FGF) and other chemokines to stimulate angiogenesis and thus the growth of a tumour.

== Markers ==
CAFs produce a number of proteins that are specific to the origin of the cells. However, as there are no specific protein to CAFs, a combination of these proteins are then used as markers to identify CAFs High levels of the marker would mean a low prognosis due to the stage of cancer.

The Function of CAF Markers
Name of markers	Functions
α-smooth muscle actin (α-SMA, ACTA2)	Marker for myofibroblasts
Fibroblast activation protein (FAP)	Marker for myofibroblasts
Tenascin-C	Regulates adhesion of cancer cells for invasion
Periostin	Product of process of tissue repair
Neuron glial antigen-2 (NG2, CSPG4)	More associated with pericytes. What fibroblasts come from
Vimentin	Plasma membrane associated protein
Desmin	Marker for maturation of microvessels (to mark for angiogenesis)
Discoidin domain-containing receptor 2 (DDR2)	
Platelet derived growth factor receptor-α and β (PDGFR α and β)	
Fibroblast specific protein-1 (FSP-1)- S100A4	Myofibroblasts and fibroblasts make up CAFs
ASPN	potential new marker of CAF
STC1	Potential new marker of CAF

Markers for CAFs are notably similar to those of surrounding tumour-associated cells but at the same time, display massive heterogeneity of behaviour, appearance and genotype.

In 2017 Swedish researchers tried to classify molecularly distinct fibroblasts into groups depending on their differential expression of markers. They found overlapping expression patterns which supported the idea that there are transitional states and even identified pluripotency in some patients’ activated fibroblasts (suggesting progenitor cells).

Pleiotropic functions (e.g. tumour-promoting and tumour-inhibiting) require cell plasticity.

While there are positive markers for CAFs, there are also negative markers namely; cytokeratin and CD3, as CAFs do not have epithelial and endothelial characteristics.

== Potential origin ==
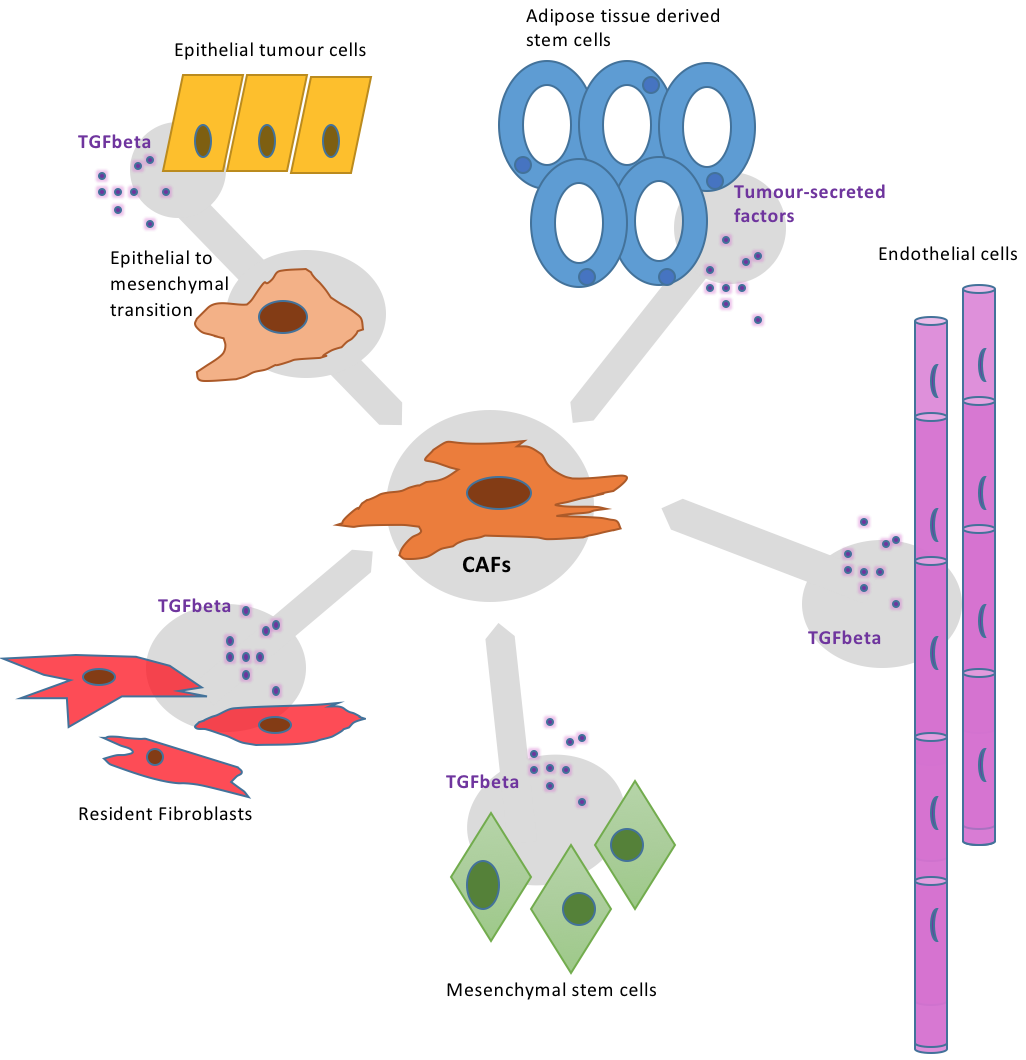
Origins of Cancer-associated fribroblasts (modified from 2014 Journal of Seminal Cancer Biology)

The origins of CAF differ depending on the tumour histotype and where the tumour originated in the first place but can be broadly separated into 4 categories. The origin of each type of CAF has a role in determining the function of that specific cell.

=== Resident ===
These CAFs arise from fibroblasts within the vicinity of the tumour that have been recruited by cancer derived growth factor. This process is similar to active inflammation with the main difference between these two processes being that, in cancer, the fibroblasts can't be deactivated which has led to tumours being referred to as “wounds that do not heal.” It is believed that most CAFs arise from differentiated resident fibroblast cells.

The normal fibroblast cells receive a hormone signal from nearby cancer cells, indicating that it must become activated, and is thus classed as a CAF. It is unclear why normal fibroblasts transition into CAFs but it has been found that by adding transforming growth factor-β to fibroblasts in culture they start to display features of CAFs. TGF-β is known to control the activation of fibroblasts in inflammation.

=== Recruitment from other sites ===
CAFs can also be recruited from a remote source, such as the bone marrow. For example, fibroblasts recruited from the bone marrow were found in breast cancer.

=== Differentiation ===
CAFs can also be derived from differentiation of other cell types such as mesenchymal stem cells, which was proved in murine models with cancers such as glioma, breast, pancreatic and gastric cancers. Another suggested origin is differentiation of endothelial or epithelial cells via trans-differentiation or epithelial to mesenchymal transition, respectively.

Less common origin of CAFs is by differentiation of other tumor adjacent cells such as epithelial or endothelial cells, adipocytes, pericytes and smooth muscle cells. Adipocytes, especially white adipocytes transdifferentiate into CAFs upon activation with TGF-β1. Through TGF-β1 can be transformed also peritoneal mesothelial cells.

It has been suggested that CAFs are better conceptualised as a “cell state” Research has found that CAF trans-differentiation can be caused by epigenetic factors.

== Roles in cancer ==
=== Prognosis ===
In general, the presence and density of cancer associated fibroblasts (CAF) point towards a bad prognosis for the patient, and so, are pro-tumour. These could however be used as markers for diagnosis and therapies, thus diagnosing at an earlier stage.

The presence of podoplanin in CAFs has been found to play a fundamental role in worsening the prognosis of patients with lung adenocarcinoma; this could however be helpful as a marker to diagnose at an early stage.

In oesophageal adenocarcinomas, CAFs release the ECM (Extracellular Matrix) protein periostin and promote tumour cell growth through paracrine signalling. However, blocking specific integrin receptors and pathways can ceases the invasion of tumor cells. The greater the density of CAFs found in oral cancer, the poorer the prognosis, as this significantly decreases the 5 year survival rate. Being female in this study also proved to be a bigger risk factor, with men being protected more against the effects.

=== Effect on Tumour Cells ===
Cancer-associated fibroblasts negatively influence the outcome of oncological diseases. These cells create a stromal niche for cancer cells and especially cancer stem cells, where they employ both paracrine and direct cell-contact to maintain stemness in cancer stem cells. In turn, this enables these cancer stem cells to escape chemotherapy and radiotherapy, while the cancer-associated fibroblasts also create an environment that allows cancer cells to escape the action anti-tumour immunity. In turn, this promotes the cancer process through tumour growth and also fosters angiogenesis, metastasis and immune evasion. CAF express various cytokines and factors, which activate and contribute to pathways favouring tumorigenesis. They may disrupt normal cell functions, such as cell cycle regulation and cell death, or signal to specific types of cells to mobilize and activate their pro-tumour actions. Furthermore, it has been found that the effect of CAF on neoplastic cells is unique to the type of tumour cells. Cytokine release from CAFs have been linked to breast carcinomas through the metabolism and production of androgen synthesis enzymes. Furthermore, on the topic of the progression of breast cancer, CAFs induces the release growth factors such as FGF and HGF which in turn induces the hyperproliferation of epithelial cells of the breast. EMT and ECM reorganisation are further mechanisms by which the CAFs induce cancer. FSP1, which is secreted by CAFs, promotes tumours through another method - by altering the tumour microenvironment (TME). Some CAFs also recycle the by-products of anaerobic metabolism by resorting to other metabolic pathways to sustain the growth of cancer cells.

=== Effect on the immune microenvironment ===
CAFs can produce cytokine TGF-β which has inhibitory effect on T cells, macrophages and neutrophils thus they are not able to promote immune response against the tumor.

Immune system is greatly affected by CAFs. CAFs promote the recruitment of monocytes and induce their differentiation into pro-tumorigenic macrophage subset M2. In breast cancer secretion of monocyte chemotactic protein-1, stromal-derived factor 1 and chitinase 3-like 1 is a signal for monocyte migration and differentiation into M2 subset. Similar effect was observed in prostate carcinoma. In pancreatic cancer, other cytokines have central role in monocyte differentiation into M2 subset such as M-CSF1, IL-6 and CCL2. Other cytokines such as IL-8, IL-10, TGF-β also participate. Such M2 macrophages then further activate progression of CAFs.

CAFs have inhibitory effects on NK cells by releasing prostaglandin E2 (PGE2). In hepatocellular carcinoma besides PGE2, indoleamine 2,3-dioxygenase (IDO) is suppressing NK cells.

In the restriction of anti-tumor immunity are crucial regulatory T cells (Treg; Foxp3+). CAFs stimulate migration, induction and maintenance of Treg cells which depends on the chemokines CCL5 and CXCL12.

Critical for anti-tumor immunity are cytotoxic CD8+ T cells. CAFs decrease their infiltration into tumor by releasing chemokine CXCL12 and cytokines IL-6 and TGF-β. However, for T cell movement restriction in tumors is also responsible hypoxia, which leads to decrease of expression of adhesion molecules on endothelial cells. Other mechanism how T cells are suppressed by CAFs is high expression of checkpoint molecules such as PD-L1, PD-L2, B7-H3/H4, galectins and the enzyme IDO. CAFs in pancreatic cancer upregulate PD-1, CTLA-4 or TIM-3 on both CD4+ and CD8+ T cell surfaces.

=== Angiogenesis ===
Angiogenesis is an essential aspect of tumour development. In order for a tumour to grow and significantly increase in size, it must have a sufficient blood supply. If the tumour is unable to develop the blood supply it requires, cells within the tumour will begin to die and further growth will be halted. Angiogenic factors such as vascular endothelial growth factor (VEGF), stromal cell-derived factor 1 (SDF-1), fibroblast growth factor (FGF) and platelet-derived growth factor (PDGF) are expressed by CAF to encourage the growth of new blood vessels. Some of these factors may also recruit cells that are vital to the angiogenic process, for instance SDF-1 attracts bone-marrow derived endothelial cells.

=== Metastasis ===
CAF have been found to promote tumour metastasis in numerous ways. Firstly, they may alter gene expression and have been found to upregulate specific genes involved in pro-tumorigenic pathways including heat shock factor 1 (HSF1). They can also interfere with the function of tumour suppressor genes, such as Tumour protein p53, leading to higher rates of cell proliferation due to the loss of control of the cell cycle. Additionally, CAF have the ability to break down proteins in the extracellular matrix and basement membranes leading to disruption to the normal structure allowing cells to move away from their primary region. The group of proteins known as the matrix metalloproteinases are key to this process. CAF also direct the movement of neoplastic cells by using the Rho-dependent signaling pathway to create tracks for these cells in the matrix.

=== Chemoresistance ===
In some cases, the characteristics of CAF provide therapeutic resistance. Soluble factor resistance occurs when CAF either directly secrete signals (cytokines or growth factors) or influence the cells around them to give off similar signals, which reduce the efficacy of therapeutic drugs. For instance, this can either be done by an increased secretion of antiapoptotic factors or by altering the cell environment (e.g. pH) to counteract the actions of the drug. Another form is cell adhesion- mediated drug resistance. This involves the tight attachment of neoplastic cells to the extracellular matrix or stromal cells. For example, secretion of TGF-beta allows cancerous cells to bind more successfully to the extracellular matrix thus evading the action of some cancer drugs.
