= Transamidation =

Transamidation is a chemical reaction in which an amide reacts with an amine to generate a new amide:

RC(O)NR'_{2} + HNR"_{2} → RC(O)NR"_{2} + HNR'_{2}

The reaction is rarely employed, but it could prove relevant to peptide synthesis.

Amides are characteristically inert, but the amino substituents can be exchanged in the presence of Lewis acid and organometallic catalysts. Primary amides (RC(O)NH_{2}) are more amenable to this reaction.

== Ureas ==
In contrast to the reluctance of amides as substrates, urea is more susceptible to this exchange process. Transamidation is practiced, sometimes even on an industrial scale, to prepare a variety of N-substituted ureas:

(H_{2}N)_{2}CO + R_{2}NH → (R_{2}N)(H_{2}N)CO + NH_{3}
(R_{2}N)(H_{2}N)CO + R_{2}NH → (R_{2}N)_{2}CO + NH_{3}

Methylurea, precursor to theobromine, is produced from methylamine and urea. Phenylurea is produced similarly but from anilinium chloride:

(H_{2}N)_{2}CO + [C_{6}H_{5}NH_{3}]Cl → (C_{6}H_{5}(H)N)(H_{2}N)CO + NH_{4}Cl

Hydrazine derivatives of urea are often produced by transamidation-like reactions. These products include carbohydrazide, semicarbazide, and biurea.
