= Tissue transglutaminase =

Protein-coding gene in the species Homo sapiens

TGM2
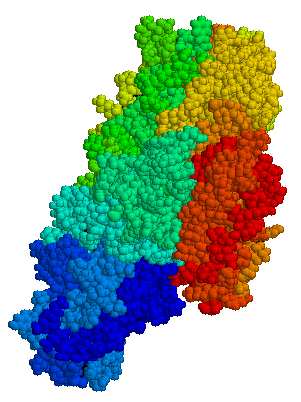

Identifiers
- Aliases: TGM2, G-ALPHA-h, GNAH, HEL-S-45, TG2, TGC, TG(C), transglutaminase 2, G(h), hTG2, tTG
- External IDs: OMIM: 190196; MGI: 98731; GeneCards: TGM2
Available structures
PDB	Ortholog search: PDBe RCSB
PDB	List of PDB id codes 4PYG, 1KV3, 2Q3Z, 3LY6, 3S3J, 3S3P, 3S3S
Enzyme activity
EC #	BRENDA	ExPASy	KEGG	MetaCyc
2.3.2.13	↗	↗	↗	↗
3.5.1.44	↗	↗	↗	↗

Gene location (Human)
Chr.	Chromosome 20 (human)
Band	20q11.23	Start	38,127,385 bp
Band	20q11.23	End	38,166,578 bp

Gene location (Mouse)
Chr.	Chromosome 2 (mouse)
Band	2 H1|2 78.72 cM	Start	157,958,322 bp
Band	2 H1|2 78.72 cM	End	157,988,356 bp
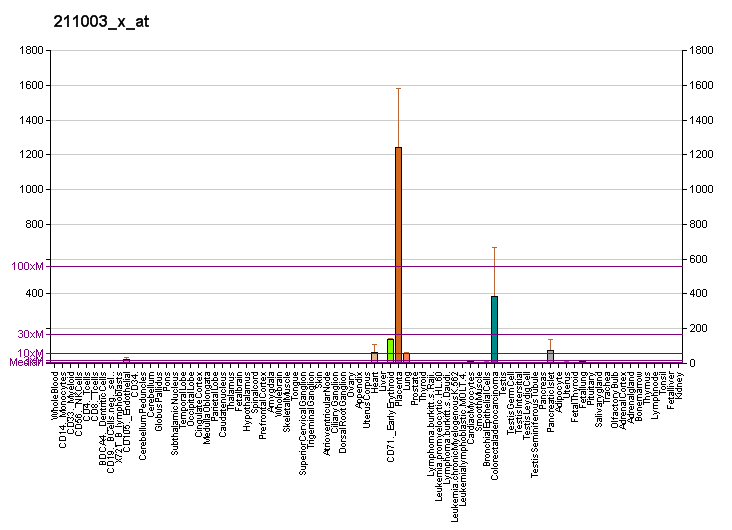

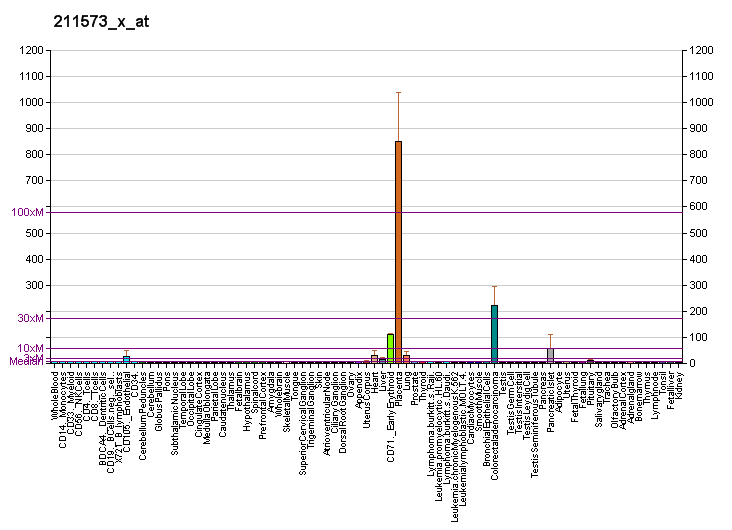

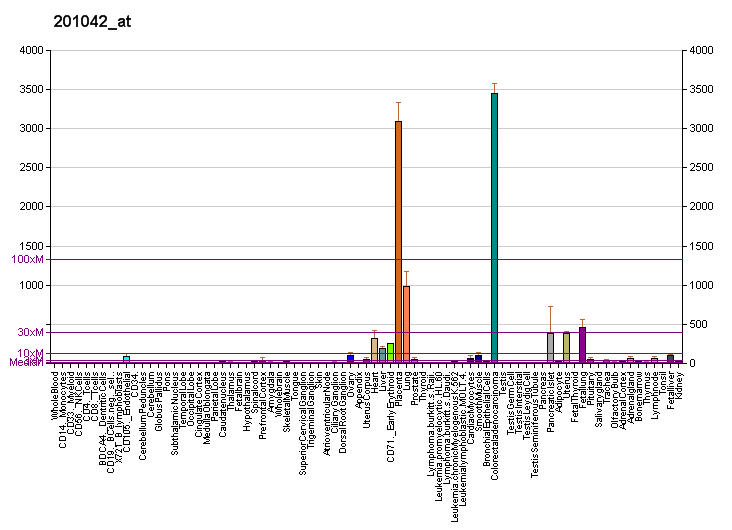
RNA expression pattern
Bgee	Human / Mouse (ortholog); Top expressed in: beta cell; right coronary artery; left coronary artery; canal of the cervix; popliteal artery; tibial arteries; right auricle of heart; right uterine tube; upper lobe of left lung; decidua / Top expressed in: conjunctival fornix; Paneth cell; tunica media of zone of aorta; ascending aorta; right lung lobe; ciliary body; mesenteric lymph nodes; efferent ductule; carotid body; external carotid artery; More reference expression data
BioGPS	More reference expression data
Gene ontology
Molecular function	transferase activity; acyltransferase activity; protein-glutamine gamma-glutamyltransferase activity; protein binding; metal ion binding; GTP binding; protein domain specific binding
Cellular component	cytoplasm; intrinsic component of plasma membrane; cytosol; extracellular exosome; focal adhesion; mitochondrion; endoplasmic reticulum; plasma membrane; extracellular matrix; collagen-containing extracellular matrix
Biological process	apoptotic cell clearance; phospholipase C-activating G protein-coupled receptor signaling pathway; salivary gland cavitation; negative regulation of endoplasmic reticulum calcium ion concentration; positive regulation of mitochondrial calcium ion concentration; peptide cross-linking; positive regulation of cell adhesion; branching involved in salivary gland morphogenesis; positive regulation of inflammatory response; positive regulation of I-kappaB kinase/NF-kappaB signaling; positive regulation of cytosolic calcium ion concentration involved in phospholipase C-activating G protein-coupled signaling pathway; isopeptide cross-linking via N6-(L-isoglutamyl)-L-lysine; positive regulation of apoptotic process; protein homooligomerization; positive regulation of smooth muscle cell proliferation; blood vessel remodeling
Sources:Amigo / QuickGO
Orthologs
Databases	NCBI: entry; OMA: entry
Species	Human	Mouse
Entrez	7052	21817
Ensembl	ENSG00000198959	ENSMUSG00000037820
UniProt	P21980	P21981
RefSeq (mRNA)	NM_004613; NM_198951; NM_001323316; NM_001323317; NM_001323318	NM_009373
RefSeq (protein)	NP_001310245; NP_001310246; NP_001310247; NP_004604; NP_945189	NP_033399
Location (UCSC)	Chr 20: 38.13 – 38.17 Mb	Chr 2: 157.96 – 157.99 Mb
PubMed search
- Wikidata
View/Edit Human	View/Edit Mouse

Protein-glutamine gamma-glutamyltransferase

Identifiers
- EC no.: 2.3.2.13
- CAS no.: 80146-85-6

Databases
- BRENDA: enzyme data
- ExPASy: NiceZyme view
- KEGG: enzyme entry
- MetaCyc: metabolic pathway
- Rhea: reactions
- PDB structures: RCSB PDB PDBe PDBsum
- Gene Ontology: AmiGO / QuickGO
Search
- PMC: articles
- PubMed: articles
- NCBI: proteins

Tissue transglutaminase (abbreviated as tTG or TG2) is a 78-kDa, calcium-dependent enzyme (EC 2.3.2.13) of the protein-glutamine γ-glutamyltransferases family (or simply transglutaminase family). Like other transglutaminases, it crosslinks proteins between an ε-amino group of a lysine residue and a γ-carboxamide group of glutamine residue, creating an inter- or intramolecular bond that is highly resistant to proteolysis (protein degradation). Aside from its crosslinking function, tTG catalyzes other types of reactions including deamidation, GTP-binding/hydrolyzing, and isopeptidase activities. Unlike other members of the transglutaminase family, tTG can be found both in the intracellular and the extracellular spaces of various types of tissues and is found in many different organs including the heart, the liver, and the small intestine. Intracellular tTG is abundant in the cytosol but smaller amounts can also be found in the nucleus and the mitochondria. Intracellular tTG is thought to play an important role in apoptosis. In the extracellular space, tTG binds to proteins of the extracellular matrix (ECM), binding particularly tightly to fibronectin. Extracellular tTG has been linked to cell adhesion, ECM stabilization, wound healing, receptor signaling, cellular proliferation, and cellular motility.

tTG is the autoantigen in celiac disease, a lifelong illness in which the consumption of dietary gluten causes a pathological immune response resulting in the inflammation of the small intestine and subsequent villous atrophy. It has also been implicated in the pathophysiology of many other diseases, including such as many different cancers and neurogenerative diseases.

== Structure ==
=== Gene ===
The human tTG gene is located on the 20th chromosome (20q11.2-q12).

=== Protein ===
TG2 is a multifunctional enzyme that belongs to transglutaminases which catalyze the crosslinking of proteins by epsilon-(gamma-glutamyl)lysine isopeptide bonds. Similarly to other transglutaminases, tTG consists of a GTP/ GDP binding site, a catalytic domain, two beta barrel and a beta-sandwich. Crystal structures of TG2 with bound GDP, GTP, or ATP have demonstrated that these forms of TG2 adopt a "closed" conformation, whereas TG2 with the active site occupied by an inhibitory gluten peptide mimic or other similar inhibitors adopts an "open" conformation. In the open conformation the four domains of TG2 are arranged in an extended configuration, allowing for catalytic activity, whereas in the closed conformation the two C-terminal domains are folded in on the catalytic core domain which includes the residue Cys-277. The N-terminal domain only shows minor structural changes between the two different conformations.

== Mechanism ==
The catalytic mechanism for crosslinking in human tTG involves the thiol group from a Cys residue in the active site of tTG. The thiol group attacks the carboxamide of a glutamine residue on the surface of a protein or peptide substrate, releasing ammonia, and producing a thioester intermediate. The thioester intermediate can then be attacked by the surface amine of a second substrate (typically from a lysine residue). The end product of the reaction is a stable isopeptide bond between the two substrates (i.e. crosslinking). Alternatively, the thioester intermediate can be hydrolyzed, resulting in the net conversion of the glutamine residue to glutamic acid (i.e. deamidation). The deamidation of glutamine residues catalyzed by tTG is thought to be linked to the pathological immune response to gluten in celiac disease. A schematic for the crosslinking and the deamidation reactions is provided in Figure 1.

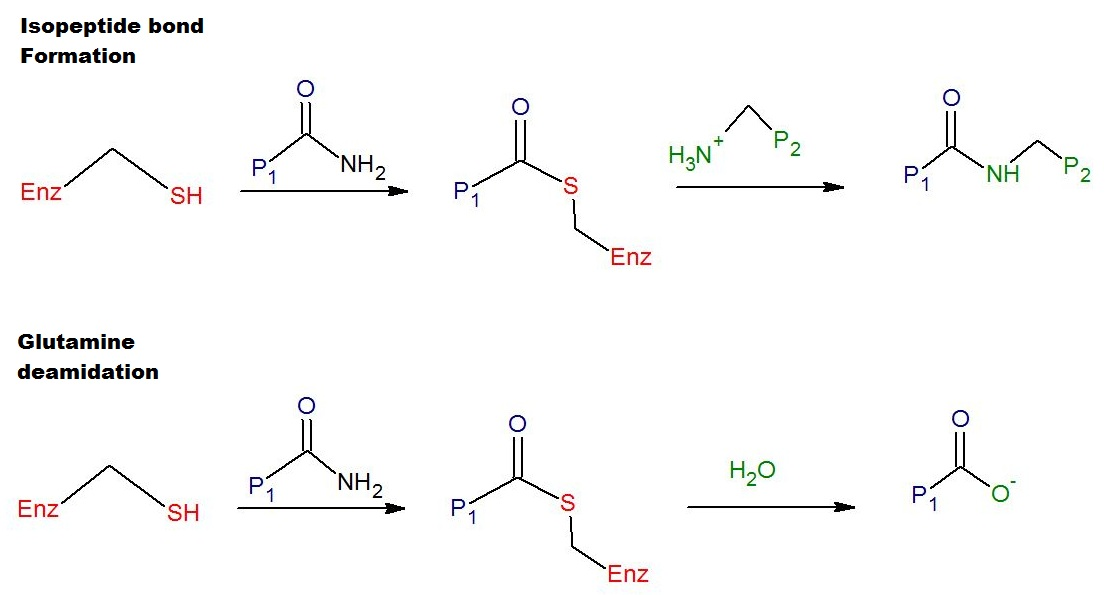
Figure 1: Transamidation (crosslinking) and deamidation mechanisms of tissue transglutaminase

== Regulation ==
The expression of tTG is regulated at the transcriptional level depending on complex signal cascades. Once synthesized, most of the protein is found in the cytoplasm, plasma membrane and ECM, but a small fraction is translocated to the nucleus, where it participates in the control of its own expression through the regulation of transcription factors.

Crosslinking activity by tTG requires the binding of Ca^{2+} ions. Multiple Ca^{2+} can bind to a single tTG molecule. Specifically, tTG binds up to 6 calcium ions at 5 different binding sites. Mutations to these binding sites causing lower calcium affinity, decrease the enzyme's transglutaminase activity. In contrast, the binding of one molecule of GTP or GDP inhibits the crosslinking activity of the enzyme. Therefore, intracellular tTG is mostly inactive due to the relatively high concentration of GTP/GDP and the low levels of calcium inside the cell. Although extracellular tTG is expected to be active due to the low concentration of guanine nucleotides and the high levels of calcium in the extracellular space, evidence has shown that extracellular tTG is mostly inactive. Recent studies suggest that extracellular tTG is kept inactive by the formation of a disulfide bond between two vicinal cysteine residues, namely Cys 370 and Cys 371. When this disulfide bond forms, the enzyme remains in an open confirmation but becomes catalytically inactive. The, oxidation/reduction of the disulfide bond serves as a third allosteric regulatory mechanism (along with GTP/GDP and Ca^{^{2+}}) for the activation of tTG. Thioredoxin-1 has been shown to activate extracellular tTG by reducing the disulfide bond. Another disulfide bond can form in tTG, between the residues Cys-230 and Cys-370. While this bond does not exist in the enzyme's native state, it appears when the enzyme is inactivated via oxidation. The presence of calcium protects against the formation of both disulfide bonds, thus making the enzyme more resistant to oxidation.

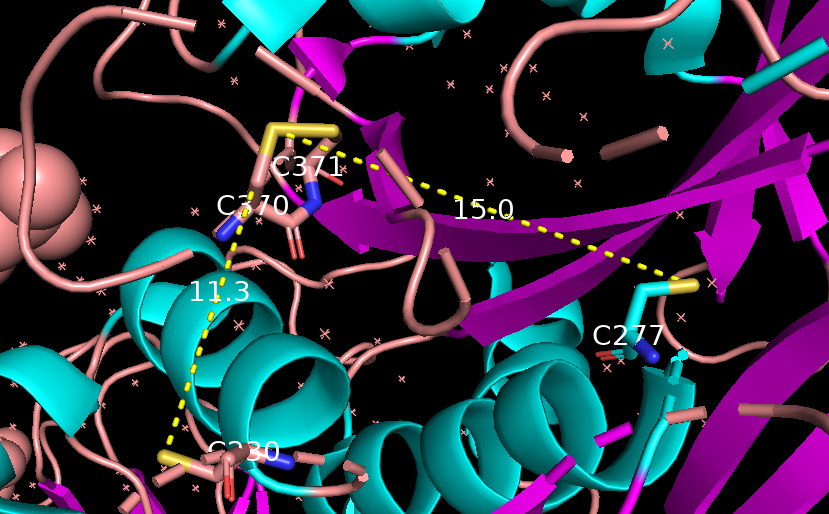
Figure 2: Cystein residues relevant in tTG activity. The disulfide bond between Cys 370 and Cys 371 has formed, therefore the enzyme is in an active conformation. The distance between Cys 370 and Cys 230 is 11.3 Å. Cys 277 is the cystein located within the active site of the enzyme.

Recent studies have suggested that interferon-γ may serve as an activator of extracellular tTG in the small intestine; these studies have a direct implication to the pathogenesis of celiac disease. Activation of tTG has been shown to be accompanied by large conformational changes, switching from a compact (inactive) to an extended (active) conformation. (see Figure 3)

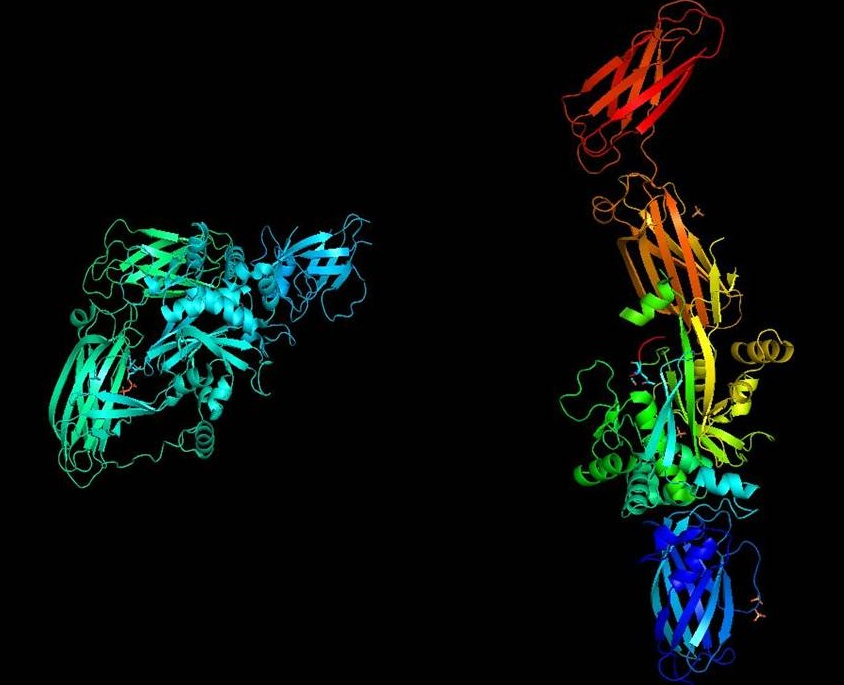
Figure 3: Compact (inactive) and extended (active) conformations of tTG

In the extracellular matrix, TG2 is "turned off", due primarily to the oxidizing activity of endoplasmic reticulum protein 57 (ERp57). Thus, tTG is allosterically regulated by two separate proteins, Erp57 and TRX-1. (See Figure 4).

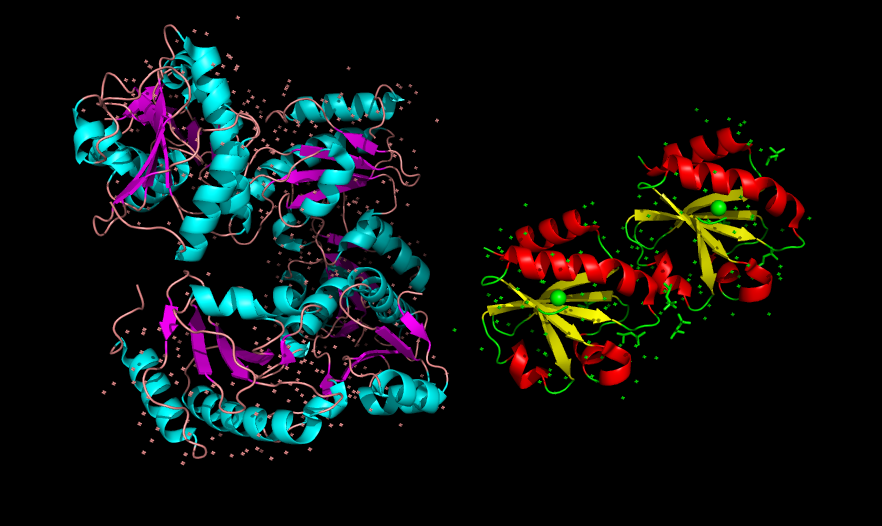
Figure 4: The proteins that allosterically regulate tTG. On the left Erp57 which oxidizes tTG and on the right TRX-1 which reduces tTG.

== Function ==
tTG is expressed ubiquitously and is present in various cellular compartments, such as the cytosol, the nucleus, and the plasma membrane. It requires calcium as a cofactor for transamidation activity. Transcription is increased by retinoic acid. Among its many supposed functions, it appears to play a role in wound healing, apoptosis, and extracellular matrix development as well as differentiation and cell adhesion. It has been noted that tTG may have very different activity in different cell types. For example, in neurons, tTG supports the survival of cells subjected to injury whereas in astrocytes knocking out the gene expression for tTG is beneficial to cell survival.

tTG is thought to be involved in the regulation of the cytoskeleton by crosslinking various cytoskeletal proteins including myosin, actin, and spectrin. Evidence shows that intracellular tTG crosslinks itself to myosin. It is also believed that tTG may stabilize the structure of the dying cells during apoptosis by polymerizing the components of the cytoskeleton, therefore preventing the leakage of the cellular contents into the extracellular space.

tTG also has GTPase activity: In the presence of GTP, it suggested to function as a G protein participating in signaling processes. Besides its transglutaminase activity, tTG is proposed to also act as kinase, and protein disulfide isomerase, and deamidase. This latter activity is important in the deamidation of gliadin peptides, thus playing important role in the pathology of coeliac disease.

tTG also presents PDI (Protein Disulfide Isomerase) activity. Based on its PDI activity, tTG plays an important role in the regulation of proteostasis, by catalyzing the trimerization of HSF1 (Heat Shock Factor 1) and thus the body's response to heat shock. In the absence of tTG, the response to heat shock is impaired since the necessary trimer is not formed.

== Clinical significance ==
tTG is the most comprehensively studied transglutaminase and has been associated with many diseases. However, none of these diseases are related to an enzyme deficiency. Indeed, thus far no disease has been attributed to the lack of tTG activity and this has been attested through the study of tTG knockout mice.

=== Celiac Disease ===
tTG is best known for its link with celiac disease. It was first associated with celiac disease in 1997 when the enzyme was found to be the antigen recognized by the antibodies specific to celiac. Anti-transglutaminase antibodies result in a form of gluten sensitivity in which a cellular response to Triticeae glutens that are crosslinked to tTG are able to stimulate transglutaminase specific B-cell responses that eventually result in the production of anti-transglutaminase antibodies IgA and IgG. tTG specifically deamidates the glutamine residues creating epitopes that increase the binding affinity of the gluten peptide to the antigen presenting T cells, initiating an adaptive immune response.

=== Cancer ===
Recent studies suggest that tTG also plays a role in inflammation and tumor biology. tTG expression is elevated in multiple cancer cell types and is implicated in drug resistance and metastasis due to its ability to promote mesenchymal transition and stem cell like properties. In its GTP bound form, tTG contributes to cancer cell survival and appears to be a cancer driver. tTG is upregulated in cancer cells and tissues in many cancer types, including leukemia, breast cancer, prostate cancer, pancreatic cancer and cervical cancer. Higher tTG expression also correlates with higher instances of metastasis, chemotherapy resistance, lower survival rates and generally poor prognosis. Cancer cells can be killed by increasing calcium levels through the activation of tTG transamidation activity. Preclinical trials have shown promise in using tTG inhibitors as anti-cancer therapeutic agents. However, other studies have noted that tTG transamidation activity could be linked to the inhibition of tumor cell invasiveness.

=== Other diseases ===
tTG is believed to contribute to several neurodegenerative disorders including Alzheimer's, Parkinson's, and Huntington's diseases by affecting transcription, differentiation and migration and adhesion . Such neurological diseases are characterized in part by the abnormal aggregation of proteins due to the increased activity of protein crosslinking in the affected brain. Additionally, specific proteins associated with these disorders have been found to be in vivo and in vitro substrates of tTG. Although tTG is up regulated in the areas of the brain affected by Huntington's disease, a recent study showed that increasing levels of tTG do not affect the onset and/or progression of the disease in mice. Recent studies show that tTG may not be involved in AD as studies show it is associated with erythrocyte lysis and is a consequence of the disease rather than a cause.

tTG has also been linked to the pathogenesis of fibrosis in various organs including the lung and the kidney. Specifically, in kidney fibrosis, tTG contributes to the stabilization and accumulation of the ECM affecting TGF beta activity.

=== Diagnostic ===
Serology for anti-tTG antibodies has superseded older serological tests (anti-endomysium, anti-gliadin, and anti-reticulin) and has a strong sensitivity (99%) and specificity (>90%) for identifying celiac disease. Modern anti-tTG assays rely on a human recombinant protein as an antigen.

=== Therapeutic ===
It's still experimental to use tTG as a form of surgical glue. It is also being studied as an attenuator of metastasis in certain tumors. tTG shows promise as a potential therapeutic target to treat cardiac fibrosis, through the activity of a highly selective tTG inhibitor. tTG inhibitors have also been shown to inhibit the formation of toxic inclusions related to neurodegenerative diseases. This indicates that tTG inhibitors could also serve as a tool to mitigate the progression of tTG brain related diseases.

== Interactions ==
TG2 participates in both enzymatic and non-enzymatic interactions. Enzymatic interactions are formed between TG2 and its substrate proteins containing the glutamine donor and lysine donor groups in the presence of calcium. Substrates of TG2 are known to affect TG2 activity, which enables it to subsequently execute diverse biological functions in the cell. However, the importance of non-enzymatic interactions in regulating TG2 activities is yet to be revealed. Recent studies indicate that non-enzymatic interactions play physiological roles and enable diverse TG2 functions in a context-specific manner.

Mouse Mutant Alleles for Tgm2
Marker Symbol for Mouse Gene. This symbol is assigned to the genomic locus by the MGI	Tgm2
Mutant Mouse Embryonic Stem Cell Clones. These are the known targeted mutations for this gene in a mouse.	Tgm2^{tm1a(KOMP)Wtsi}
Example structure of targeted conditional mutant allele for this gene
Molecular structure of Tgm2 region with inserted mutation sequence
These Mutant ES Cells can be studied directly or used to generate mice with this gene knocked out. Study of these mice can shed light on the function of Tgm2: see Knockout mouse

== Erp57 ==
Endoplasmic reticulum protein 57 (Erp57), is a chaperone molecule involved in loading peptide onto MHC class I molecules in the endoplasmic reticulum.

Transglutaminase 2 (TG2) is a ubiquitously expressed (intracellular as well as extracellular) protein, with multiple modes of post-translational regulation, including an allosteric disulfide bond between Cys-370-Cys-371 that renders the enzyme inactive in the extracellular matrix.

Endoplasmic reticulum (ER)-resident protein 57 (ERp57), a protein in the ER that promotes folding of nascent proteins and is also present in the extracellular environment, has the cellular and biochemical characteristics for inactivating TG2. We found that ERp57 colocalizes with extracellular TG2 in cultured human umbilical vein endothelial cells (HUVECs).ERp57 oxidized TG2 with a rate constant that was 400-2000-fold higher than those of the aforementioned small molecule oxidants. Moreover, its specificity for TG2 was also markedly higher than those of other secreted redox proteins, including protein disulfide isomerase (PDI), ERp72, TRX, and quiescin sulfhydryl oxidase 1 (QSOX1).
