= Dopaminylation =

Post-translational modification

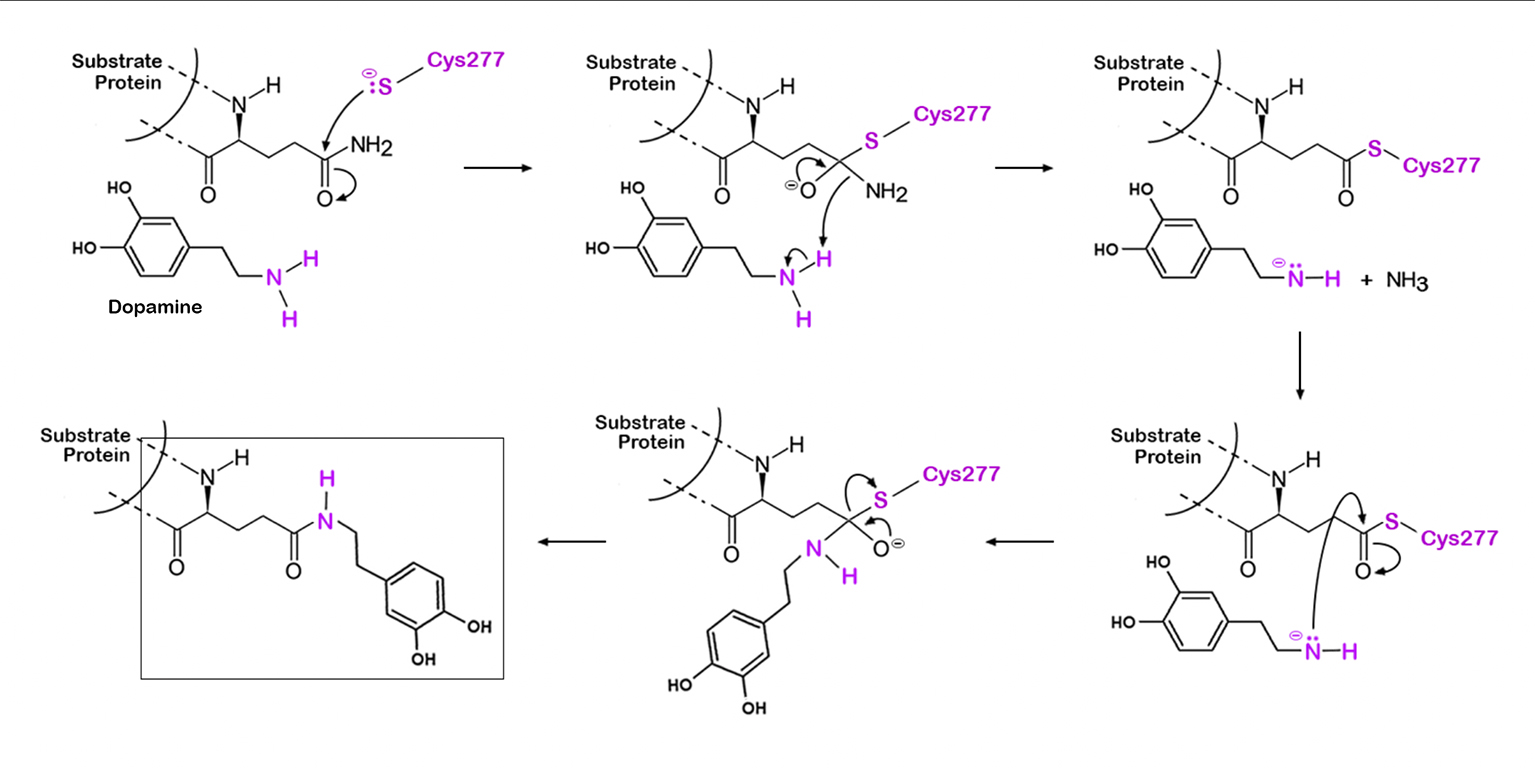
- Post-translational modification in which dopamine is covalently attached to glutamine residues via reactions catalyzed by TGM2.

Biochemical Reaction
- Part of: Cell
- Located: Nucleus, Cytoplasm
- Category: Post-translational modification
- Type: Monoaminylation

Central Functions
- Promotes Drug-Seeking Behaviors Regulates Cocaine-Induced Gene Expression Modulation of Stress-Induced Epigenetic Signatures

Key Enzymes
- TGM2

Discovered
2011	Diego Walther & Colleagues; Propose monoaminylation as a novel set of post-translational modifications
2020	Ashley Lepack & Colleagues; Discover histone dopaminylation as a novel post-translational modification
2024	Nan Zhang & Colleagues; Develop a bicyclononyne (BCN)-probe for chemical proteomic profiling of dopaminylation in cells
2024	Nan Zhang & Colleagues; Identify over 400 dopaminylated proteins in a colorectal cancer cell line
- Category

Protein dopaminylation refers to the post-translational modification in which dopamine is covalently attached to glutamine residues via transamidation. In general, protein monoaminylation refers to the overall class of post-translational modifications involving monoamines; however, these reactions are further classified by the individual monoamine reactant they describe (i.e., dopaminylation, serotonylation, histaminylation).

Dopaminylation has been reported for both histone and non-histone protein substrates, and thus represents a distinct neuroepigenetic and neuroproteomic regulatory mechanism with various implications in health and disease. Recent studies have unveiled a critical role for dopaminylation in mediating a wide range of physiological processes, be that in the nervous system or beyond. Dopaminylation is known to contribute to several significant neuropsychiatric disorders (i.e., drug addiction, substance use disorder), and has also been found to promote lung regeneration through suppression of ferroptosis.

To date, the dopaminylation proteome has remained largely unexplored due to a lack of efficient pan-specific antibodies targeting dopaminylated glutamine. Notably, histone H3, fibronectin, and TPI1 were the only identified targets of protein dopaminylation until 2024, when a recently developed bicyclononyne (BCN)-containing probe was successfully applied in chemical proteomic profiling of the dopaminylation proteome in cancer cells. Herein, authors present emerging evidence suggesting that 425 proteins possessed dopaminylation sites in a colorectal cancer cell line (ie., HCT 116 cells). The advent of this BCN probe is anticipated to enable more extensive investigations of dopaminylation in 2026, and may facilitate a substantial increase in studies on the functions of dopaminylation in both health and disease. Nevertheless, dopaminylation has been reported in a variety of tissues, including the nucleus accumbens (NAc), ventral tegmental area (VTA), amygdala, and in the vascular endothelial niche. Dopaminylation is known to influence both drug-seeking behaviors (i.e., cocaine, heroin) and differential gene expression programs associated with substance abuse, and has been associated with changes in epigenetic signatures within the limbic system following early-life stressful social experience (SSE) in rats.

== Identification ==
Protein monoaminylation was first identified in 1957 by Heinrich Waelsch and colleagues at Columbia University. After discovering that primary amines could be covalently incorporated into proteins via transamidation at glutamine residues, the group went on to uncover the enzyme catalyzing these reactions, effectively naming it "transglutaminase" after its function.

Despite its discovery in the mid-twentieth century, monoaminylation was not investigated as a post-translational modification until 2003, when Diego Walther and colleagues at the Max-Planck-Institute for Molecular Genetics revealed that serotonylation of small GTPases mediates ⍺-granule release during the activation and aggregation of platelets.

Notably, monoaminylation was not uncovered as an epigenetic regulatory mechanism until 2019, when Lorna Farrelly and colleagues at the Icahn School of Medicine reported the H3Q5-serotonylation (H3Q5ser) modification for the first time. Later, in 2020, the H3Q5-dopaminylation (H3Q5dop) modification was identified in the striatum by Ashley Lepack and colleagues also at the Icahn School of Medicine. Five years later, Qingfei Zheng and colleagues at Ohio State University discovered the H3Q5-histaminylation (H3Q5his) modification in the posterior hypothalamic tuberomammillary nucleus (TMN).

In 2024, Nan Zhang and colleagues at Ohio State University developed a bicyclononyne (BCN)-containing probe to address the lack of efficient pan-specific antibodies targeting dopaminylated glutamine. Herein, the group successfully applied the BCN-probe in chemical proteomic profiling of the dopaminylation proteome in a colorectal cancer cell line (ie., HCT 116 cells), identifying over 400 dopaminylated proteins and providing extensive pathway enrichment data following their analyses using the Kyoto Encyclopedia of Genes and Genomes (KEGG) database.

== Mechanism ==
Dopaminylation is catalyzed by transglutaminase 2 (TGM2) in a calcium-dependent manner, and relies upon the intracellular bioavailability of dopamine substrates. Generally, protein dopaminylation occurs in the cytoplasm; however, histone dopaminylation only occurs within the nucleus. Nevertheless, the mechanism for TGM2-catalyzed dopaminylation is identical for both histone and non-histone proteins alike.

Structurally, Ca^{2+} binds directly to TGM2 itself and not to the substrate molecule. Once Ca^{2+} binds to TGM2, a 4 nm relaxation about the major axis of the protein exposes the active site to available substrates. The active site itself is composed of a well conserved catalytic triad (Cys277–His335–Asp358) situated within a substrate binding channel, which is bordered by two conserved residues (Trp241 and Trp332) that facilitate catalysis through stabilization of the transition state. Once intracellular Ca^{2+} binds to TGM2 and exposes the substrate binding channel, the glutamine residue of a substrate protein (i.e., histone H3, TPD1) is free to enter the enzyme active site. As a transamidation reaction, the mechanism for protein dopaminylation can be summarized in two parts: an initial thioester formation, followed by isopeptide bond formation.

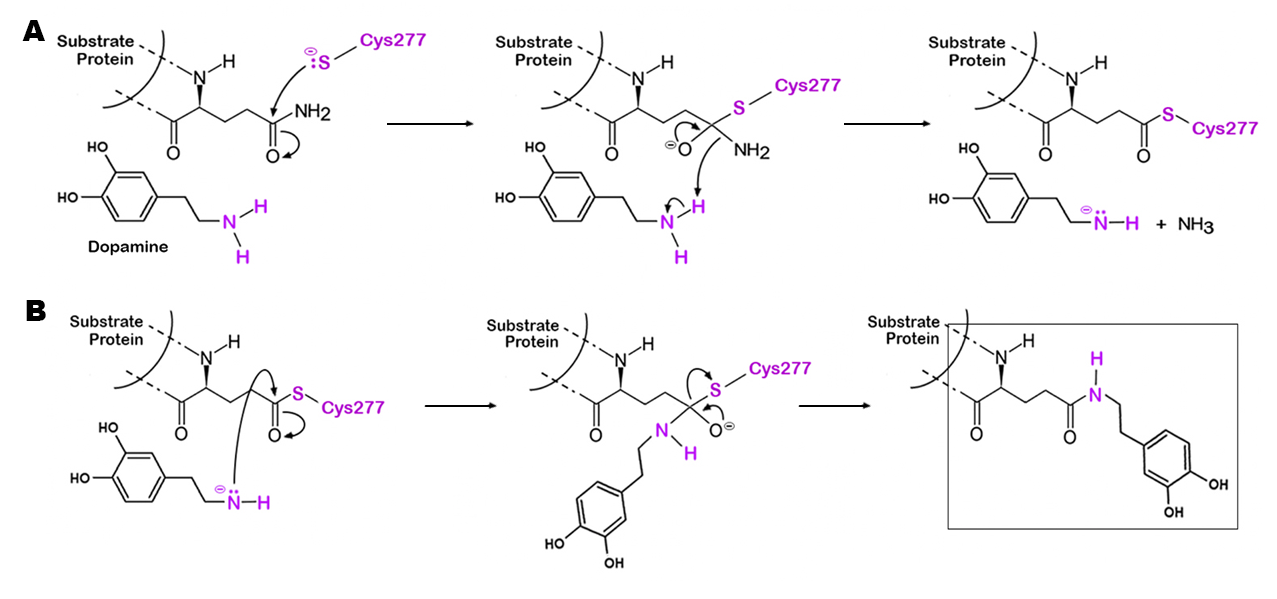

Fig. 1 Mechanism for Protein Dopaminylation
Dopaminylation is a two step, Ca^{2+}-dependent reaction in which TGM2 catalyzes the covalent attachment of dopamine onto the glutamine residue of a substrate protein (i.e., Histone H3, TPI1). (A) The catalytic cysteine residue (Cys277) of TGM2 facilitates an initial acyl transfer reaction, which is ultimately followed by isopeptide bond formation (B).

When intracellular Ca^{2+} and dopamine concentrations are sufficient, TGM2-catalyzed dopaminylation of substrate proteins can occur. First, the catalytic cysteine residue (Cys277) in the TGM2 active site nucleophilically attacks the 𝛾-carboxamido group of the glutamine residue in an acyl transfer reaction (Fig. 1A), forming a thioester intermediate and releasing one molecule of ammonia (NH_{3}) as a result. Next, the deprotonated primary amine of the dopamine substrate nucleophilically attacks the 𝛾-thioester group of the intermediate, forming a stable isopeptide bond and ultimately releasing the enzyme (Fig. 1B).

== Functions ==
=== Histone Dopaminylation ===
With the discovery of histone monoaminylation in 2019, monoaminylation thus entered into the complex and ever-growing field of epigenetics, posing as a dynamic set of novel regulatory mechanisms. To date, histone H3 is the only histone protein known to undergo monoaminylation modifications, which have only been reported for glutamine position 5 (Gln5) of histone H3 (hereafter referred to as H3Q5). As such, histone monoaminylation currently refers to the covalent addition of monoamines to glutamine at position 5 (Gln5) of histone H3. Histone serotonylation remains the most widely reported histone monoaminylation modification to date, though both histone dopaminylation and histone histaminylation have also been reported.

Histone monoaminylation modifications (i.e., H3Q5-dopaminylation, H3Q5-serotonylation, H3Q5-histaminylation) are associated with a number of regulatory effects, no two of which appear to be the same. H3Q5-dopaminylation (H3Q5dop) in particular has remained a seldom explored topic since its discovery in 2020. Nevertheless, H3Q5dop has been reported in dopaminergic neurons of the nucleus accumbens (NAc), ventral tegmental area (VTA), and amygdala. H3Q5-dopaminylation has been implicated in a variety of processes, including cocaine-induced transcriptional plasticity, heroin-induced transcriptional and behavioral plasticity, and drug-induced transcriptional and behavioral changes. Data as to the effects of H3Q5dop are displayed in detail within the table below:

Monoaminylation	Tissue	Modification	Biological Function	References
Dopaminylation	Ventral Tegmental Area (VTA)	H3Q5dop; H3K4me3Q5dop	Promotes relapse-like behavior and modulates neuronal gene expression patterns in the VTA following cocaine consumption	(Lepack et al., 2020)
Dopaminylation	Nucleus Accumbens (NAc)	H3Q5dop	Promotes cocaine-seeking behavior and regulates cocaine-induced gene expression programs	(Stewart et al., 2023)
Dopaminylation	Ventral Tegmental Area (VTA)	H3Q5dop	Promotes heroin-seeking behavior and regulates gene expression programs associated with heroin abstinence	(Fulton et al., 2022)
Dopaminylation	Amygdala	H3Q5dop	Modification was identified following early-life stressful social experience (SSE) in rat pups	(Rajan et al., 2023)

Recent studies have examined the role of dopaminylation modifications in the adult brain with respect to drug exposure (i.e., cocaine, heroin). In post-mortem human brain tissues, H3Q5dop levels were significantly reduced in the VTA of cocaine-dependent drug users, relative to matched controls. Interestingly, stable levels of H3K4me3Q5dop were also observed within the same area in the brains of cocaine-dependent drug users, along with relatively unchanged expression levels of H3K4me3, total histone H3, and TGM2. Moreover, histone dopaminylation was critically involved in modulating aberrant neuronal gene expression patterns in the VTA following cocaine consumption. Further investigations using a rodent model revealed that increased H3Q5dop levels following prolonged withdrawal from extended access to cocaine self-administration regulated relapse-like behaviors, thereby establishing a role for histone dopaminylation in orchestrating long-term behavioral outcomes in substance use disorder via modulation of epigenetic programs within the mesocortical dopaminergic pathway.

In a study on the limbic system, low levels of trimethylation and dopaminylation of histone H3 at lysine position 4 (H3K4) and glutamine position 5 (H3Q5) in the amygdala led to failure in novel odor recognition for rat pups undergoing novel odor preference testing. However, the authors of this study omit whether such modifications were in fact detected concurrently (i.e., H3K4me3Q5dop). Nevertheless, scent recognition testing serves as a critical methodology for evaluating memory, cognitive function, and sensory perception in rodent models, and thus represents an important mechanism for evaluating changes in neurotransmission and epigenetic regulation in response to environmental conditions such as stress. Herein, failure to recognize novel odor was reportedly linked to increased dopamine transmission, decreased levels of TGM2, and increased histone trimethylation (H3K4me3) and dopaminylation (H3Q5dop) in the amygdala following exposure to early-life stressful social experience (SSE). It remains unclear whether the reported fluctuations in TGM2 levels could be attributed to changes in TGM2 expression levels or changes in TGM2 activity levels. Ambiguity aside, this data provides useful insight, as early-life adversity paradigms appear sufficient for reconfiguration of epigenetic signatures within the limbic system, thereby establishing stable, differential epigenetic programs which may contribute to lifelong susceptibility for affective psychopathologies (i.e., major depressive disorder, bipolar disorder, anxiety disorders).

=== Protein Dopaminylation ===
While research has demonstrated several roles for histone dopaminylation in modulating transcriptional and behavioral plasticity, the cellular dopaminylated proteome has remained poorly understood, largely in part due to the lack of efficient pan-specific antibodies targeting dopaminylated glutamine. However, a recently developed bicyclononyne (BCN)-containing probe has been successfully applied in chemical proteomic profiling of the dopaminylation proteome in cancer cells. Herein, authors present emerging evidence suggesting that 425 proteins possessed dopaminylation sites in a colorectal cancer cell line (ie., HCT 116 cells). Further analysis using the Kyoto Encyclopedia of Genes and Genomes (KEGG) database revealed that these dopaminylated proteins were involved in numerous signal transduction pathways, RNA processing pathways, and several disease-associated signaling pathways.

Details as to the identified dopaminylated proteins are displayed in the tables below. However, only 176 of the 425 identified dopaminylated proteins were named by the authors within their supplementary materials, and as such, only those 176 proteins can be discussed within this article. Nevertheless, to benefit this article, the list of 176 proteins has been reanalyzed using the KEGG database, and the details of the identified KEGG PATHWAY and KEGG BRITE search results are displayed in the data tables below. The following data table lists the dopaminylated proteins (ie., out of those 176 proteins) identified by KEGG BRITE across 10 protein families related to genetic information processing:

BRITE Category	Identified Dopaminylated Proteins	Reference
Spliceosome	ALYREFCBX3FRG1FUBP1FUSHNRNPA2B1HNRNPA3HNRNPDLHNRNPFHNRNPH1HNRNPH3HNRNPKHNRNPLLLUC7LMBNL1NSRP1PQBP1PRPF8PSPC1RBM15BRBM22RBM4RBMXL1RP9SAFBSAFB2SCAF4SDE2SF3A3SFPQSMNDC1SNRPASNRPCSONSRRM2SRSF11SUGP1TCERG1WBP11ZNF326	(Zhang et al., 2024)
mRNA Biogenesis	ALYREFAPOBEC3BAPOBEC3FCASC3CNOT2CPSF2CPSF4FIP1L1FXR2HNRNPA2B1LIMD1NUP133NUP50NUP58NUP62NUP98PCF11RBM15BSUPT5HTAF15TNRC6ATNRC6BZC3H14ZFP36L2	(Zhang et al., 2024)
Transcription Machinery	ARID2CPSF4HEXIM1IWS1MED1MED12MED23PCF11POLR2BSCAF4SFPQSUPT5HTAF15TAF6LZC3H8ZNF143ZNF326	(Zhang et al., 2024)
Chromosome & Associated Proteins	AEBP2ANKRD17ARID2ARID4BBPTFBRCA1CARM1CBX3CBX4CDCA5CENPFCLSPNDNTTIP2DRG1ESCO1FLOT1HAT1HMGB3ING1JMJD1CLIMD1NCAPG2NCOA3NCOR1NPM1NSD1NUMA1NUP133NUP98PAXIP1RBBP5RESTSTAG2TAF6LTELO2TNRC6ATNRC6BUBN2YY1ZMYM3ZNF217	(Zhang et al., 2024)
Ribosome Biogenesis	DNTTIP2HEATR1NIFKNOL9NPLOC4PWP1PWP2TBL3WDR75	(Zhang et al., 2024)
Ribosome Biogenesis	DNTTIP2HEATR1NIFKNOL9NPLOC4PWP1PWP2TBL3WDR75	(Zhang et al., 2024)
DNA Repair & Recombination Proteins	BRCA1CLSPNDUTPOLD1POLR2BSDE2TELO2UIMC1	(Zhang et al., 2024)
DNA Replication Proteins	POLD1SDE2TELO2	(Zhang et al., 2024)
tRNA Biogenesis	DARS2ELAC2ELP2	(Zhang et al., 2024)
Translation Factors	DRG1EEF1D	(Zhang et al., 2024)

The KEGG database is composed of multiple database modalities, in which data on various proteins, biological pathways, and diseases are listed for bioinformatics research. Enrichment analysis of gene-sets is typically performed using the web-based tool ShinyGO, within which KEGG databases may be used to convert lists of genes into details on functional hierarchies and pathway enrichment. Notably, KEGG PATHWAY is a collection of manually annotated pathway maps, which illustrate various enzyme-catalyzed reactions and detail their components. Moreover, KEGG BRITE is another database listed within the KEGG program, which acts as a functional hierarchy viewer and allows users to identify higher-order cellular functions from large-scale datasets. With this in mind, the following data table lists the dopaminylated proteins (ie., out of those 176 proteins) identified by KEGG BRITE across 14 protein families related to genetic information processing or signaling and cellular processes:

BRITE Category	Identified Dopaminylated Proteins	Reference
Enzymes	ABL1BRCA1CARM1DARS2DUTELAC2HAT1MTORNCOA3NSD1OTUD4POLD1POLR2BPRDX1PRDX5PRKCDRNF138TAOK1USP47USP7	(Zhang et al., 2024)
Transcription Factors	AEBP2ARID2ARID4BCICCNBPCREB1FOXJ3GLI2KLF5LRRFIP1NFX1RAI1RERERESTSP1SP3STAT1TFCP2YY1ZBTB7AZC3H8ZFXZHX1ZHX3ZNF16ZNF638ZNF668ZNF8ZSCAN26	(Zhang et al., 2024)
Protein Phosphatases & Associated Proteins	AXIN1BRCA1MAPTNCOR1SFPQTSC2UBN2WBP11YLPM1	(Zhang et al., 2024)
Ubiquitin System	BRCA1CBX4NFX1RNF138USP47USP7ZBTB7A	(Zhang et al., 2024)
Membrane Trafficking	BAG3FLOT1MAPTMTORNCOA7	(Zhang et al., 2024)
Cytoskeleton Proteins	FHOD1LMNAMAPTTMPO	(Zhang et al., 2024)
Protein Kinases	ABL1MTORPRKCDTAOK1	(Zhang et al., 2024)
Domain-containing Proteins Not Elsewhere Classified	FHL2LRWD1PXNSORBS3	(Zhang et al., 2024)
Peptidases & Inhibitors	OTUD4USP7USP47	(Zhang et al., 2024)
Glycosaminoglycan Binding Proteins	C1QBPHDGF	(Zhang et al., 2024)
Chaperones & Folding Catalysts	BAG3CALR	(Zhang et al., 2024)
Proteasome	PSMD4PSMD10	(Zhang et al., 2024)
Amino Acid-Related Enzymes	DARS2	(Zhang et al., 2024)
Lectins	CALR	(Zhang et al., 2024)

KEGG pathway maps are an invaluable resource for visualizing enzyme-catalyzed reactions and the details of their components. Pathway maps have been generated for a vast number of human diseases, from cancers (ie., by type) to substance addiction (ie., by drug) to neurodegenerative and prion diseases. The following data table lists the dopaminylated proteins (ie., out of those 176 proteins) identified by KEGG PATHWAY across a number of human diseases, with the link to each disease pathway map provided below:

Disease or Infection	KEGG Pathway Map Link	Identified Dopaminylated Proteins	Reference
Amyotrophic Lateral Sclerosis	KEGG ALS Pathway Map	ALYREFNUP50DAXXHNRNPA3NUP62MTORFUSHNRNPA2B1NUP98NUP133PSMD4NUP58	(Zhang et al., 2024)
Transcriptional Misregulation in Cancer	KEGG Transcriptional Misregulation in Cancer Map	JMJD1CFUSSP1TAF15NCOR1	(Zhang et al., 2024)
Breast Cancer	KEGG Breast Cancer Pathway Map	MTORSP1BRCA1NCOA3AXIN1	(Zhang et al., 2024)
HIV-1 Infection	KEGG HIV-1 Infection Pathway Map	APOBEC3FAPOBEC3BCALRMTORPXNTAB2	(Zhang et al., 2024)
Huntington's Disease	KEGG Huntington's Disease Pathway Map	CREB1MTORPOLR2BPSMD4RESTSP1	(Zhang et al., 2024)
Chemical Carcinogenesis	KEGG Chemical Carcinogenesis Pathway Map (Receptor Activation); KEGG Chemical Carcinogenesis Pathway Map (ROS)	ABL1CREB1KLF5MTORPRKCD	(Zhang et al., 2024)
HPV Infection	KEGG HPV Infection Pathway Map	AXIN1CREB1MTORNFX1PXNSTAT1TSC2	(Zhang et al., 2024)
General Pathways in Cancer	KEGG General Pathways in Cancer Map	ABL1AXIN1GLI2MTORNCOA3SMAD4SP1STAT1	(Zhang et al., 2024)
HSV-1 Infection	KEGG HSV-1 Infection Pathway Map	ALYREFCALRDAXXMTORSTAT1TAB2TSC2	(Zhang et al., 2024)
Shigellosis	KEGG Shigellosis Pathway Map	CBX3MTORPRKCDPXNTAB2TAB3	(Zhang et al., 2024)
Alzheimer's Disease	KEGG Alzheimer's Disease Pathway Map	AXIN1MAPTMTORPSMD4	(Zhang et al., 2024)
Parkinson Disease	KEGG Parkinson Disease Pathway Map	DAXXMAPTPSMD4	(Zhang et al., 2024)
MicroRNAs in Cancer	KEGG MicroRNAs in Cancer Pathway Map	CDCA5MTORABL1HNRNPKBRCA1	(Zhang et al., 2024)
Spinocerebellar Ataxia/td>	KEGG Spinocerebellar Ataxia Pathway Map	CICMTORPSM4PUM2SP1	(Zhang et al., 2024)
Cushing Syndrome/td>	KEGG Cushing Syndrome Pathway Map	AXIN1CREB1RBBP5SP1	(Zhang et al., 2024)
Hepatocellular Carcinoma	KEGG Hepatocellular Carcinoma Pathway Map	ARID2MTORSMAD4AXIN1	(Zhang et al., 2024)
Viral Carcinogenesis	KEGG Viral Carcinogenesis Pathway Map	CREB1HNRNPKPXNUSP7	(Zhang et al., 2024)
Gastric Cancer	KEGG Gastric Cancer Pathway Map	AXIN1MTORSMAD4	(Zhang et al., 2024)
Pancreatic Cancer	KEGG Pancreatic Cancer Pathway Map	MTORSMAD4STAT1	(Zhang et al., 2024)
Colorectal Cancer	KEGG Colorectal Cancer Pathway Map	AXIN1MTORSMAD4	(Zhang et al., 2024)
Choline Metabolism in Cancer	KEGG Choline Metabolism in Cancer Pathway Map	MTORSP1TSC2	(Zhang et al., 2024)
Basal Cell Carcinoma	KEGG Basal Cell Carcinoma Pathway Map	AXIN1GLI2	(Zhang et al., 2024)
Chronic Myeloid Leukemia	KEGG Chronic Myeloid Leukemia Pathway Map	ABL1SMAD4	(Zhang et al., 2024)
Neutrophil Extracellular Trap (NET) Formation	KEGG NET Pathway Map	HAT1MTOR	(Zhang et al., 2024)
Prostate Cancer	KEGG Prostate Cancer Pathway Map	CREB1MTOR	(Zhang et al., 2024)
Glioma	KEGG Glioma Pathway Map	MTOR	(Zhang et al., 2024)
Endometrial Cancer	KEGG Endometrial Cancer Pathway Map	AXIN1	(Zhang et al., 2024)

KEGG pathway maps are also organized for individual signal transduction pathways (ie., Hippo signaling, JAK-STAT pathway, etc). Pathway maps have been generated for a vast number of cell signaling cascades, from canonical pathways (ie., Wnt signaling) to broader endocrine systems (ie., estrogen signaling) to more specified signaling molecules and interactions (ie., IgSF CAM signaling). The following data table lists the dopaminylated proteins (ie., out of those 176 proteins) identified by KEGG PATHWAY across a number of signal transduction pathways, with the link to each signaling pathway map provided in the table below:

Signaling Pathway	KEGG Pathway Link	Identified Dopaminylated Proteins	Reference
AMPK Signaling Pathway	KEGG AMPK Signaling Pathway Map	CREB1MTORTSC2	(Zhang et al., 2024)
Apelin Signaling Pathway	KEGG Apelin Signaling Pathway Map	MTORSMAD4	(Zhang et al., 2024)
C-Type Lectin Receptor Signaling; Pathway	KEGG C-Type Lectin Receptor Signaling Pathway Map	PRKCDSTAT1	(Zhang et al., 2024)
Cadherin Signaling	KEGG Cadherin Signaling Pathway Map	ATN1AXIN1ERBINLIMD1RERETAOK1	(Zhang et al., 2024)
Chemokine Signaling Pathway	KEGG Chemokine Signaling Pathway Map	PRKCDPXNSTAT1	(Zhang et al., 2024)
ErbB Signaling Pathway	KEGG ErbB Signaling Pathway Map	ABL1MTOR	(Zhang et al., 2024)
Estrogen Signaling Pathway	KEGG Estrogen Signaling Pathway Map	CREB1NCOA3PRKCDSP1	(Zhang et al., 2024)
Hippo Signaling Pathway	KEGG Hippo Signaling Pathway Map	LIMD1	(Zhang et al., 2024)
IgSF CAM Signaling	KEGG IgSF CAM Signaling Pathway Map	ABL1PXN	(Zhang et al., 2024)
Insulin Signaling Pathway	KEGG Insulin Signaling Pathway Map	FLOT1MTORTSC2	(Zhang et al., 2024)
IL-17 Signaling Pathway	KEGG IL-17 Signaling Pathway Map	TAB2TAB3	(Zhang et al., 2024)
Integrin Signaling Pathway	KEGG Integrin Signaling Pathway Map	MTORPXN	(Zhang et al., 2024)
JAK-STAT Signaling Pathway	KEGG JAK-STAT Signaling Pathway Map	MTORSTAT1	(Zhang et al., 2024)
MAPK Signaling Pathway	KEGG MAPK Signaling Pathway Map	DAXXMAPTTAB2TAOK1	(Zhang et al., 2024)
mTOR Signaling Pathway	KEGG mTOR Signaling Pathway Map	MTORTELO2TSC2	(Zhang et al., 2024)
Neurotrophin Signaling Pathway	KEGG Neurotrophin Signaling Pathway Map	ABL1PRKCD	(Zhang et al., 2024)
NF-kappa B Signaling Pathway	KEGG NF-kappa B Signaling Pathway Map	TAB2TAB3	(Zhang et al., 2024)
NOD-like Receptor Signaling Pathway	KEGG NOD-like Receptor Signaling Pathway Map	ERBINPRKCDSTAT1TAB2TAB3	(Zhang et al., 2024)
Phospholipase D Signaling Pathway	KEGG Phospholipase D Signaling Pathway Map	MTORTSC2	(Zhang et al., 2024)
PI3K-Akt Signaling Pathway	KEGG PI3K-Akt Signaling Pathway Map	BRCA1CREB1MTORTSC2	(Zhang et al., 2024)
TGF-beta Signaling Pathway	KEGG TGF-beta Signaling Pathway Map	NCOR1SMAD4SP1	(Zhang et al., 2024)
Thyroid Hormone Signaling Pathway	KEGG Thyroid Hormone Signaling Pathway Map	MED1MED12MTORNCOA3NCOR1STAT1TSC2	(Zhang et al., 2024)
Toll-Like Receptor Signaling Pathway	KEGG Toll-Like Receptor Signaling Pathway Map	STAT1TAB2	(Zhang et al., 2024)
TNF Signaling Pathway	KEGG TNF Signaling Pathway Map	CREB1TAB2TAB3	(Zhang et al., 2024)
Wnt Signaling Pathway	KEGG Wnt Signaling Pathway Map	AXIN1SMAD4	(Zhang et al., 2024)

== See also ==
- H3Q5dop
- Monoaminylation
- Histone Monoaminylation
- Serotonylation
- Histaminylation
