= Rere =

Rere may refer to:

- Really (album), by JJ Cale
- Really (TV channel)
- Really, a 2006 film starring Philip Arditti
- Really, a 2000 album by David Huff
- "Really", a 2018 song by Blackpink from Square Up

== Places ==
- Rere, Chile
- Rere, New Zealand

== Other uses ==
- RERE, a gene
- Rère, a river of France
- Rere language, spoken in Sudan

== See also ==
- RER E, a hybrid commuter rail and rapid transit line in Paris
