= AEBP2 =

Protein-coding gene in humans

Identifiers
- Aliases: AEBP2, AE binding protein 2
- External IDs: OMIM: 617934; MGI: 1338038; GeneCards: AEBP2

Gene location (Human)
Chr.	Chromosome 12 (human)
Band	12p12.3	Start	19,404,045 bp
Band	12p12.3	End	19,720,801 bp

Gene location (Mouse)
Chr.	Chromosome 6 (mouse)
Band	6|6 G2	Start	140,568,389 bp
Band	6|6 G2	End	140,624,198 bp
RNA expression pattern
Bgee	Human / Mouse (ortholog); Top expressed in: Achilles tendon; retinal pigment epithelium; skin of arm; caput epididymis; pancreatic epithelial cell; buccal mucosa cell; palpebral conjunctiva; epithelium of nasopharynx; tail of epididymis; gingival epithelium / Top expressed in: condyle; fossa; Paneth cell; medullary collecting duct; renal corpuscle; saccule; vestibular membrane of cochlear duct; ciliary body; endothelial cell of lymphatic vessel; otic placode; More reference expression data
BioGPS	n/a
Gene ontology
Molecular function	RNA polymerase II cis-regulatory region sequence-specific DNA binding; DNA binding; DNA-binding transcription repressor activity, RNA polymerase II-specific; protein binding; transcription corepressor activity; metal ion binding; nucleic acid binding; DNA-binding transcription factor activity, RNA polymerase II-specific
Cellular component	nucleus; ESC/E(Z) complex; nucleoplasm
Biological process	negative regulation of gene expression, epigenetic; regulation of transcription, DNA-templated; negative regulation of transcription by RNA polymerase II; transcription, DNA-templated; chromatin organization
Sources:Amigo / QuickGO
Orthologs
Databases	NCBI: entry; OMA: entry
Species	Human	Mouse
Entrez	121536	11569
Ensembl	ENSG00000139154	ENSMUSG00000030232
UniProt	Q6ZN18	Q9Z248
RefSeq (mRNA)	NM_001114176; NM_001267043; NM_153207; NM_001363736	NM_001005605; NM_009637; NM_178803; NM_001309436; NM_001309437
RefSeq (protein)	NP_001107648; NP_001253972; NP_694939; NP_001350665	NP_001005605; NP_001296365; NP_001296366; NP_033767; NP_848918
Location (UCSC)	Chr 12: 19.4 – 19.72 Mb	Chr 6: 140.57 – 140.62 Mb
PubMed search
- Wikidata
View/Edit Human	View/Edit Mouse

Adipocyte Enhancer-Binding Protein is a zinc finger protein that in humans is encoded by the evolutionarily well-conserved gene AEBP2. It was initially identified due to its binding capability to the promoter of the adipocyte P2 gene, and was therefore named Adipocyte Enhancer Binding Protein 2. AEBP2 is a potential targeting protein for the mammalian Polycomb Repression Complex 2 (PRC2).

== Function ==
AEBP2 is a DNA-binding transcriptional repressor. It may interact with and stimulate the activity of the PRC2 complex.

AEBP2 may regulate the migration and development of the neural crest cells through the PRC2-mediated epigenetic mechanism and is most likely a targeting protein for the mammalian PRC2 complex.

== Clinical significance ==
Diseases associated with AEBP2 include Waardenburg's syndrome, and Hirschsprung's disease.
