= LUC7L =

Protein-coding gene in humans

Identifiers
- Aliases: LUC7L, LUC7-LIKE, LUC7B1, Luc7, SR+89, hLuc7B1, LUC7 like
- External IDs: OMIM: 607782; MGI: 1914228; HomoloGene: 100558; GeneCards: LUC7L; OMA:LUC7L - orthologs

Gene location (Human)
Chr.	Chromosome 16 (human)
Band	16p13.3	Start	188,969 bp
Band	16p13.3	End	229,463 bp

Gene location (Mouse)
Chr.	Chromosome 17 (mouse)
Band	17 A3.3|17 13.09 cM	Start	26,471,870 bp
Band	17 A3.3|17 13.09 cM	End	26,504,478 bp
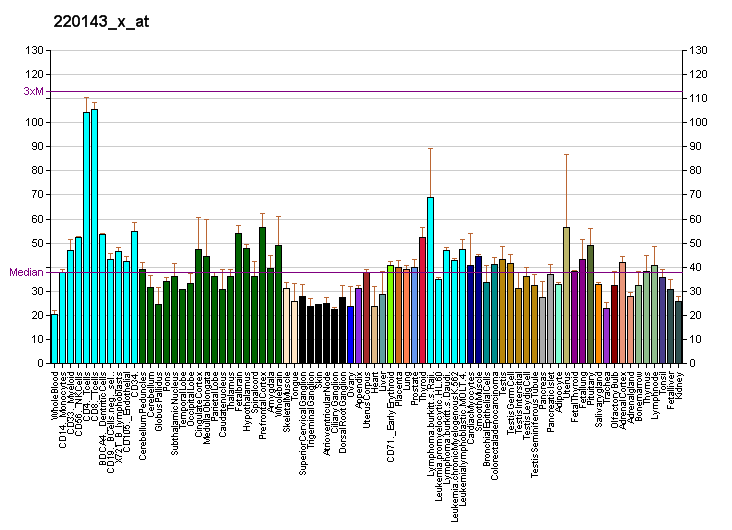
RNA expression pattern
Bgee	Human / Mouse (ortholog); Top expressed in: tendon of biceps brachii; sural nerve; anterior pituitary; left lobe of thyroid gland; right lobe of thyroid gland; cerebellar hemisphere; right hemisphere of cerebellum; right uterine tube; canal of the cervix; body of uterus / Top expressed in: neural layer of retina; Rostral migratory stream; abdominal wall; ventricular zone; medullary collecting duct; epiblast; morula; facial motor nucleus; ventromedial nucleus; substantia nigra; More reference expression data
BioGPS	More reference expression data
Gene ontology
Molecular function	RS domain binding; protein binding; mRNA binding; identical protein binding
Cellular component	U1 snRNP; U2-type prespliceosome; nucleus
Biological process	mRNA splice site selection; negative regulation of striated muscle tissue development
Sources:Amigo / QuickGO
Orthologs
Species	Human	Mouse
Entrez	55692	66978
Ensembl	ENSG00000007392	ENSMUSG00000024188
UniProt	Q9NQ29; Q1W6G4	Q9CYI4
RefSeq (mRNA)	NM_018032; NM_201412; NM_001320226; NM_001330420	NM_025881; NM_028190
RefSeq (protein)	NP_001307155; NP_001317349; NP_060502; NP_958815; NP_060502.1 NP_001307155.1	NP_080157; NP_082466
Location (UCSC)	Chr 16: 0.19 – 0.23 Mb	Chr 17: 26.47 – 26.5 Mb
PubMed search
- Wikidata
View/Edit Human	View/Edit Mouse

Putative RNA-binding protein Luc7-like 1 is a protein that in humans is encoded by the LUC7L gene.

The LUC7L gene may represent a mammalian heterochromatic gene, encoding a putative RNA-binding protein similar to the yeast Luc7p subunit of the U1 snRNP splicing complex that is normally required for 5-prime splice site selection.
