= ZNF143 =

Protein-coding gene

Identifiers
- Aliases: ZNF143, SBF, STAF, pHZ-1, zinc finger protein 143
- External IDs: OMIM: 603433; MGI: 1277969; GeneCards: ZNF143

Gene location (Human)
Chr.	Chromosome 11 (human)
Band	11p15.4	Start	9,460,319 bp
Band	11p15.4	End	9,528,524 bp

Gene location (Mouse)
Chr.	Chromosome 7 (mouse)
Band	7 E3|7 57.7 cM	Start	109,660,424 bp
Band	7 E3|7 57.7 cM	End	109,694,601 bp
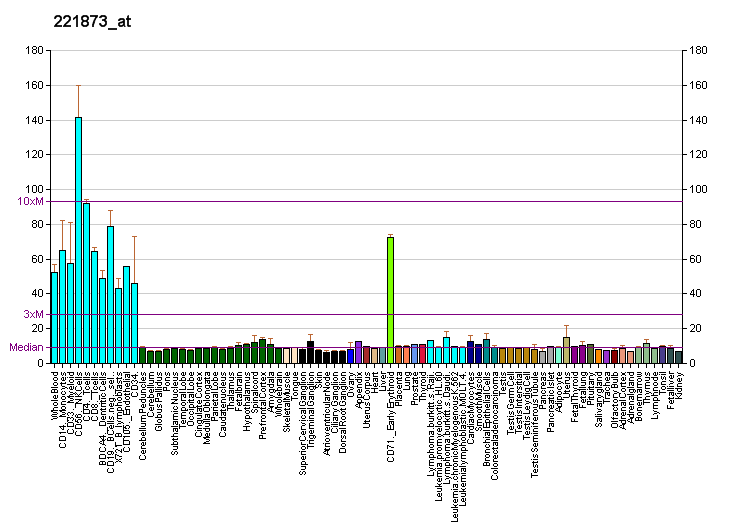
RNA expression pattern
Bgee	Human / Mouse (ortholog); Top expressed in: Achilles tendon; ventricular zone; ganglionic eminence; monocyte; gonad; testicle; islet of Langerhans; left testis; right testis; epithelium of colon / Top expressed in: granulocyte; morula; morula; primary oocyte; tail of embryo; zygote; ganglionic eminence; blood; genital tubercle; neural layer of retina; More reference expression data
BioGPS	More reference expression data
Gene ontology
Molecular function	nucleic acid binding; DNA binding; protein binding; metal ion binding; RNA polymerase II cis-regulatory region sequence-specific DNA binding; DNA-binding transcription activator activity, RNA polymerase II-specific; DNA-binding transcription factor activity, RNA polymerase II-specific; DNA-binding transcription factor activity
Cellular component	nucleus; nucleoplasm
Biological process	regulation of transcription by RNA polymerase II; regulation of transcription by RNA polymerase III; regulation of transcription, DNA-templated; transcription by RNA polymerase II; transcription, DNA-templated; transcription by RNA polymerase III; snRNA transcription by RNA polymerase II; positive regulation of transcription by RNA polymerase II
Sources:Amigo / QuickGO
Orthologs
Databases	NCBI: entry; OMA: entry
Species	Human	Mouse
Entrez	7702	20841
Ensembl	ENSG00000166478	ENSMUSG00000061079
UniProt	P52747	O70230
RefSeq (mRNA)	NM_001282656; NM_001282657; NM_003442	NM_009281; NM_001374618
RefSeq (protein)	NP_001269585; NP_001269586; NP_003433	NP_033307; NP_001361547; NP_001392700; NP_001392701
Location (UCSC)	Chr 11: 9.46 – 9.53 Mb	Chr 7: 109.66 – 109.69 Mb
PubMed search
- Wikidata
View/Edit Human	View/Edit Mouse

Zinc finger protein 143 is a protein that in humans is encoded by the ZNF143 gene.
