= DNTTIP2 =

Protein-coding gene found in humans

Identifiers
- Aliases: DNTTIP2, ERBP, FCF2, HSU15552, LPTS-RP2, TdIF2, deoxynucleotidyltransferase terminal interacting protein 2
- External IDs: OMIM: 611199; MGI: 1923173; GeneCards: DNTTIP2

Gene location (Human)
Chr.	Chromosome 1 (human)
Band	1p22.1	Start	93,866,284 bp
Band	1p22.1	End	93,879,918 bp

Gene location (Mouse)
Chr.	Chromosome 3 (mouse)
Band	3|3 G1	Start	122,068,037 bp
Band	3|3 G1	End	122,078,920 bp
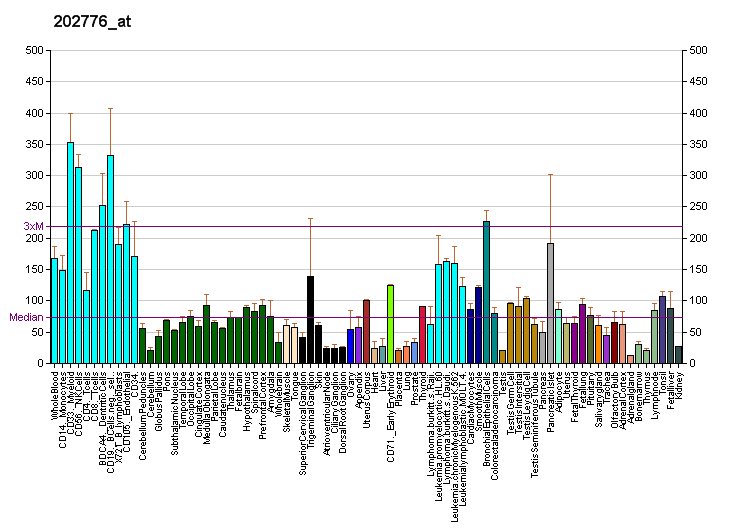
RNA expression pattern
Bgee	Human / Mouse (ortholog); Top expressed in: Achilles tendon; gonad; gingival epithelium; islet of Langerhans; testicle; ventricular zone; glutes; biceps brachii; Skeletal muscle tissue of biceps brachii; olfactory zone of nasal mucosa / Top expressed in: otic placode; otic vesicle; saccule; secondary oocyte; tail of embryo; genital tubercle; epiblast; morula; morula; zygote; More reference expression data
BioGPS	More reference expression data
Gene ontology
Molecular function	RNA binding
Cellular component	nucleus; nucleolus
Biological process	regulation of transcription, DNA-templated; transcription, DNA-templated
Sources:Amigo / QuickGO
Orthologs
Databases	NCBI: entry; OMA: entry
Species	Human	Mouse
Entrez	30836	99480
Ensembl	ENSG00000067334	ENSMUSG00000039756
UniProt	Q5QJE6	Q8R2M2
RefSeq (mRNA)	NM_014597	NM_153806
RefSeq (protein)	NP_055412	NP_722501
Location (UCSC)	Chr 1: 93.87 – 93.88 Mb	Chr 3: 122.07 – 122.08 Mb
PubMed search
- Wikidata
View/Edit Human	View/Edit Mouse

Deoxynucleotidyltransferase terminal-interacting protein 2 is an enzyme that in humans is encoded by the DNTTIP2 gene.

== Interactions ==
DNTTIP2 has been shown to interact with Estrogen receptor alpha.
