= CDCA5 =

Protein-coding gene in the species Homo sapiens

Identifiers
- Aliases: CDCA5, SORORIN, cell division cycle associated 5
- External IDs: OMIM: 609374; MGI: 1915099; GeneCards: CDCA5

Gene location (Human)
Chr.	Chromosome 11 (human)
Band	11q13.1	Start	65,066,300 bp
Band	11q13.1	End	65,084,164 bp

Gene location (Mouse)
Chr.	Chromosome 19 (mouse)
Band	19|19 A	Start	6,135,013 bp
Band	19|19 A	End	6,141,807 bp
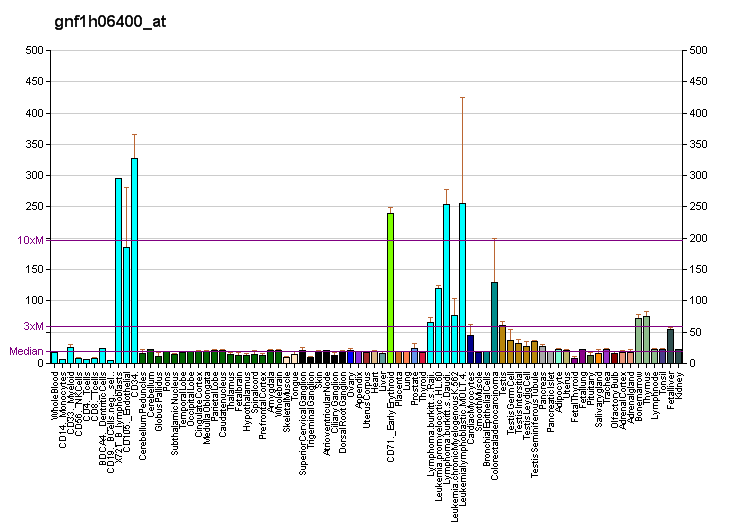
RNA expression pattern
Bgee	Human / Mouse (ortholog); Top expressed in: gonad; ventricular zone; right testis; left testis; ganglionic eminence; mucosa of transverse colon; testicle; bone marrow; secondary oocyte; appendix / Top expressed in: primary oocyte; zygote; secondary oocyte; primitive streak; fetal liver hematopoietic progenitor cell; internal carotid artery; Paneth cell; otic placode; somite; external carotid artery; More reference expression data
BioGPS	More reference expression data
Gene ontology
Molecular function	chromatin binding; protein binding; protein-containing complex binding
Cellular component	cytoplasm; cytosol; cohesin complex; chromosome; nucleoplasm; chromatin; chromosome, centromeric region; nucleus
Biological process	mitotic chromosome condensation; positive regulation of exit from mitosis; regulation of cohesin loading; cell division; mitotic sister chromatid cohesion; double-strand break repair; cell cycle; mitotic metaphase plate congression; mitotic cell cycle
Sources:Amigo / QuickGO
Orthologs
Databases	NCBI: entry; OMA: entry
Species	Human	Mouse
Entrez	113130	67849
Ensembl	ENSG00000146670	ENSMUSG00000024791
UniProt	Q96FF9	Q9CPY3
RefSeq (mRNA)	NM_080668	NM_026410
RefSeq (protein)	NP_542399	NP_080686
Location (UCSC)	Chr 11: 65.07 – 65.08 Mb	Chr 19: 6.14 – 6.14 Mb
PubMed search
- Wikidata
View/Edit Human	View/Edit Mouse

Sororin is a protein that in humans is encoded by the CDCA5 gene.

== Function ==
Sororin is required for stable binding of cohesin to chromatin and for sister chromatid cohesion in interphase.

== Clinical significance ==
Transactivation of Sororin and its phosphorylation at Ser209 by ERK play an important role in lung cancer proliferation.
