= HEATR1 =

Protein-coding gene in humans

Identifiers
- Aliases: HEATR1, BAP28, UTP10, HEAT repeat containing 1
- External IDs: MGI: 2442524; GeneCards: HEATR1

Gene location (Human)
Chr.	Chromosome 1 (human)
Band	1q43	Start	236,549,005 bp
Band	1q43	End	236,604,516 bp

Gene location (Mouse)
Chr.	Chromosome 13 (mouse)
Band	13 A1|13 4.56 cM	Start	12,409,908 bp
Band	13 A1|13 4.56 cM	End	12,455,170 bp
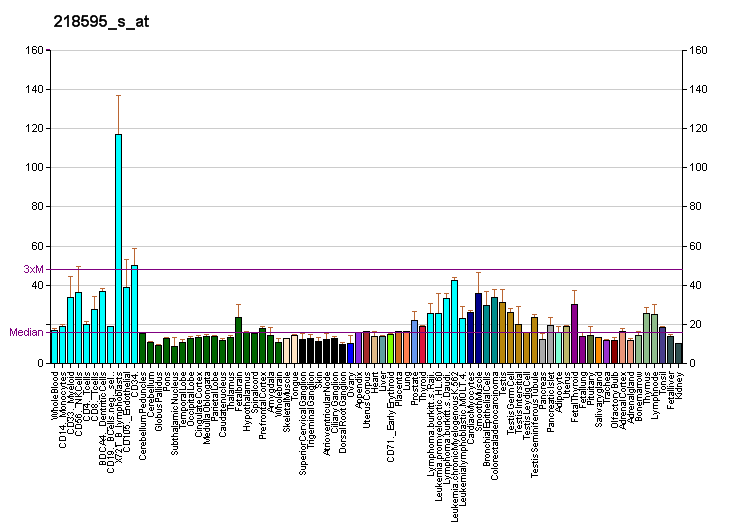

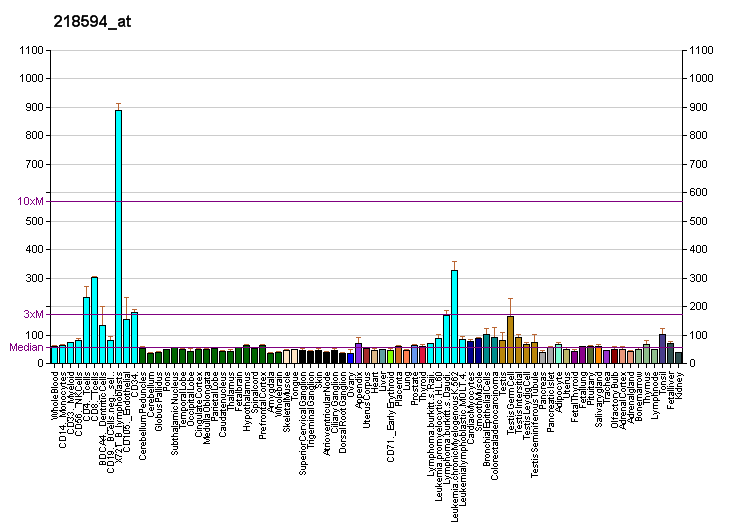
RNA expression pattern
Bgee	Human / Mouse (ortholog); Top expressed in: pancreatic ductal cell; secondary oocyte; gingival epithelium; hair follicle; epithelium of nasopharynx; tendon of biceps brachii; testicle; endothelial cell; trabecular bone; sperm / Top expressed in: tail of embryo; genital tubercle; epiblast; primitive streak; zygote; Gonadal ridge; lacrimal gland; hair follicle; secondary oocyte; yolk sac; More reference expression data
BioGPS	More reference expression data
Gene ontology
Molecular function	protein binding; snoRNA binding; RNA binding
Cellular component	small-subunit processome; membrane; mitochondrion; 90S preribosome; t-UTP complex; nucleoplasm; fibrillar center; nucleus; nucleolus
Biological process	maturation of SSU-rRNA from tricistronic rRNA transcript (SSU-rRNA, 5.8S rRNA, LSU-rRNA); ribosome biogenesis; rRNA processing; positive regulation of rRNA processing; transcription, DNA-templated; regulation of transcription, DNA-templated; positive regulation of transcription by RNA polymerase I
Sources:Amigo / QuickGO
Orthologs
Databases	NCBI: entry; OMA: entry
Species	Human	Mouse
Entrez	55127	217995
Ensembl	ENSG00000119285	ENSMUSG00000050244
UniProt	Q9H583	G3X9B1
RefSeq (mRNA)	NM_018072	NM_144835
RefSeq (protein)	NP_060542; NP_060542.4	NP_659084
Location (UCSC)	Chr 1: 236.55 – 236.6 Mb	Chr 13: 12.41 – 12.46 Mb
PubMed search
- Wikidata
View/Edit Human	View/Edit Mouse

HEAT repeat-containing protein 1 is a protein that in humans is encoded by the HEATR1 gene.
