= HNRPDL =

Mammalian protein found in Homo sapiens

HNRNPDL

Identifiers
- Aliases: HNRNPDL, HNRNP, HNRPDL, JKTBP, JKTBP2, laAUF1, LGMD1G, heterogeneous nuclear ribonucleoprotein D like, LGMDD3
- External IDs: OMIM: 607137; MGI: 1355299; GeneCards: HNRNPDL

Gene location (Human)
Chr.	Chromosome 4 (human)
Band	4q21.22	Start	82,422,565 bp
Band	4q21.22	End	82,430,462 bp

Gene location (Mouse)
Chr.	Chromosome 5 (mouse)
Band	5 E4|5 48.46 cM	Start	100,181,436 bp
Band	5 E4|5 48.46 cM	End	100,187,523 bp
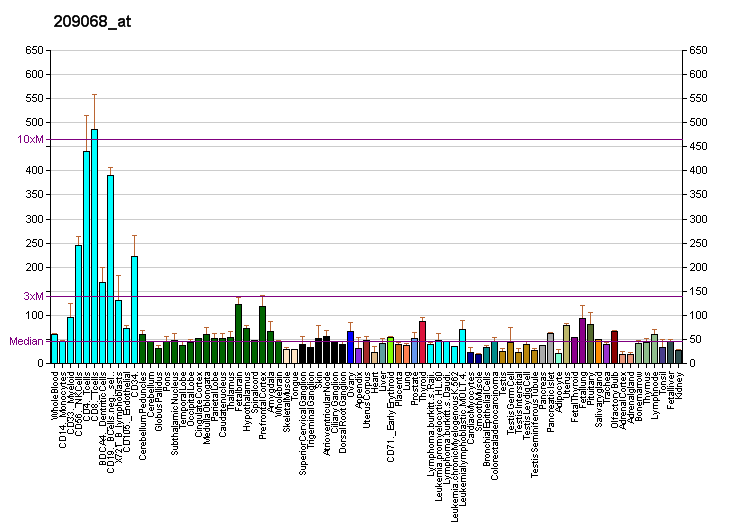

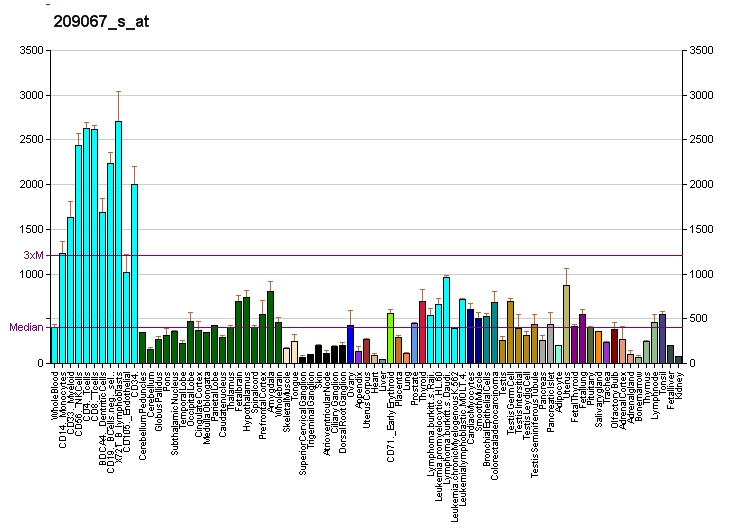

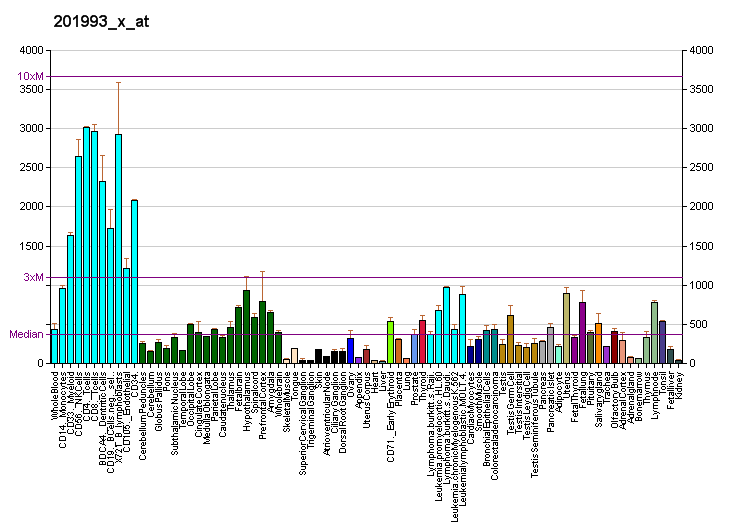
RNA expression pattern
Bgee	Human / Mouse (ortholog); Top expressed in: gonad; tendon of biceps brachii; ganglionic eminence; ventricular zone; left ovary; right ovary; body of uterus; cartilage tissue; internal globus pallidus; tibial nerve / Top expressed in: fossa; condyle; medullary collecting duct; primitive streak; Paneth cell; somite; renal corpuscle; vas deferens; endothelial cell of lymphatic vessel; hair follicle; More reference expression data
BioGPS	More reference expression data
Gene ontology
Molecular function	poly(G) binding; single-stranded DNA binding; DNA binding; double-stranded DNA binding; protein binding; poly(A) binding; nucleic acid binding; RNA binding; sequence-specific DNA binding; sequence-specific double-stranded DNA binding
Cellular component	cytoplasm; spliceosomal complex; extracellular exosome; nucleus; nucleoplasm; cytosol; ribonucleoprotein complex
Biological process	regulation of gene expression; RNA processing; regulation of transcription, DNA-templated; transcription, DNA-templated; interleukin-12-mediated signaling pathway
Sources:Amigo / QuickGO
Orthologs
Databases	NCBI: entry; OMA: entry
Species	Human	Mouse
Entrez	9987	50926
Ensembl	ENSG00000152795	ENSMUSG00000029328
UniProt	O14979	Q9Z130
RefSeq (mRNA)	NM_001207000; NM_005463; NM_031372	NM_016690
RefSeq (protein)	NP_001193929; NP_112740	n/a
Location (UCSC)	Chr 4: 82.42 – 82.43 Mb	Chr 5: 100.18 – 100.19 Mb
PubMed search
- Wikidata
View/Edit Human	View/Edit Mouse

Heterogeneous nuclear ribonucleoprotein D-like, also known as HNRPDL, is a protein which in humans is encoded by the HNRPDL gene.

== Function ==
This gene belongs to the subfamily of ubiquitously expressed heterogeneous nuclear ribonucleoproteins (hnRNPs). The hnRNPs are RNA binding proteins and they complex with heterogeneous nuclear RNA (hnRNA). These proteins are associated with pre-mRNAs in the nucleus and appear to influence pre-mRNA processing and other aspects of mRNA metabolism and transport. While all of the hnRNPs are present in the nucleus, some seem to shuttle between the nucleus and the cytoplasm. The hnRNP proteins have distinct nucleic acid binding properties. The protein encoded by this gene has two RRM domains that bind to RNAs. Two alternatively spliced transcript variants have been described for this gene. One of the variants is probably not translated because the transcript is a candidate for nonsense-mediated mRNA decay. The protein encoded by this gene is similar to its family member HNRPD.

== Clinical Significance ==
Heterozygous nonsense mutations in HNRNPDL has been identified as the cause of the autosomal disorder, Limb-girdle muscular dystrophy.
