= APOBEC3F =

Protein-coding gene in the species Homo sapiens

Identifiers
- Aliases: APOBEC3F, A3F, ARP8, BK150C2.4.MRNA, KA6, apolipoprotein B mRNA editing enzyme catalytic subunit 3F
- External IDs: OMIM: 608993; GeneCards: APOBEC3F
Available structures
PDB	Human UniProt search: PDBe RCSB
PDB	List of PDB id codes 3WUS, 4IOU, 4J4J, 5HX5, 5HX4
Enzyme activity
EC #	BRENDA	ExPASy	KEGG	MetaCyc
3.5.4.38	↗	↗	↗	↗

Gene location (Human)
Chr.	Chromosome 22 (human)
Band	22q13.1	Start	39,040,604 bp
Band	22q13.1	End	39,055,972 bp
RNA expression pattern
Bgee	Human / Mouse (ortholog); Top expressed in: granulocyte; monocyte; spleen; right ovary; left ovary; right uterine tube; lymph node; right adrenal gland; left adrenal cortex; right adrenal cortex / n/a; More reference expression data
BioGPS	n/a
Gene ontology
Molecular function	cytidine deaminase activity; zinc ion binding; metal ion binding; hydrolase activity, acting on carbon-nitrogen (but not peptide) bonds, in cyclic amidines; protein binding; catalytic activity; RNA binding; hydrolase activity; identical protein binding
Cellular component	cytoplasm; P-body; apolipoprotein B mRNA editing enzyme complex; nucleus; ribonucleoprotein complex
Biological process	negative regulation of transposition; negative regulation of viral process; immune system process; base conversion or substitution editing; negative regulation of viral genome replication; defense response to virus; DNA cytosine deamination; DNA demethylation; innate immune response; negative regulation of single stranded viral RNA replication via double stranded DNA intermediate; positive regulation of defense response to virus by host; cytidine deamination; cytidine to uridine editing
Sources:Amigo / QuickGO
Orthologs
Databases	NCBI: entry; OMA: entry
Species	Human	Mouse
Entrez	200316	n/a
Ensembl	ENSG00000128394	n/a
UniProt	Q8IUX4	n/a
RefSeq (mRNA)	NM_001006666; NM_145298	n/a
RefSeq (protein)	NP_001006667; NP_660341	n/a
Location (UCSC)	Chr 22: 39.04 – 39.06 Mb	n/a
PubMed search		n/a
- Wikidata
View/Edit Human

DNA dC->dU-editing enzyme APOBEC-3F is a protein that in humans is encoded by the APOBEC3F gene.

This gene is a member of the cytidine deaminase gene family. It is one of seven related genes or pseudogenes found in a cluster, thought to result from gene duplication, on chromosome 22. Members of the cluster encode proteins that are structurally and functionally related to the C to U RNA-editing cytidine deaminase APOBEC1. It is thought that the proteins may be RNA editing enzymes and have roles in growth or cell cycle control. Alternatively spliced transcript variants encoding different isoforms have been identified.
