= DRG1 =

Protein-coding gene in the species Homo sapiens

Available structures
PDB	Ortholog search: PDBe RCSB
PDB	List of PDB id codes 2EKI

Identifiers
- Aliases: DRG1, NEDD3, developmentally regulated GTP binding protein 1
- External IDs: OMIM: 603952; MGI: 1343297; HomoloGene: 3060; GeneCards: DRG1; OMA:DRG1 - orthologs

Gene location (Human)
Chr.	Chromosome 22 (human)
Band	22q12.2	Start	31,399,604 bp
Band	22q12.2	End	31,530,634 bp

Gene location (Mouse)
Chr.	Chromosome 11 (mouse)
Band	11|11 A1	Start	3,137,360 bp
Band	11|11 A1	End	3,216,415 bp
RNA expression pattern
Bgee	Human / Mouse (ortholog); Top expressed in: left testis; right testis; male germ cell; triceps brachii muscle; glutes; sperm; deltoid muscle; tibialis anterior muscle; Skeletal muscle tissue of rectus abdominis; quadriceps femoris muscle / Top expressed in: medial ganglionic eminence; spermatocyte; blastocyst; spermatid; morula; morula; embryo; epiblast; internal carotid artery; ventricular zone; More reference expression data
BioGPS	n/a
Gene ontology
Molecular function	nucleotide binding; GTP binding; transcription factor binding; protein binding; identical protein binding; GTPase activity; microtubule binding; hydrolase activity; potassium ion binding; metal ion binding
Cellular component	cytoplasm; polysome; membrane; cytosol; nuclear body; nucleus
Biological process	multicellular organism development; transcription, DNA-templated; cytoplasmic translation; positive regulation of microtubule polymerization; regulation of mitotic spindle assembly
Sources:Amigo / QuickGO
Orthologs
Species	Human	Mouse
Entrez	4733	13494
Ensembl	ENSG00000185721	ENSMUSG00000020457
UniProt	Q9Y295	P32233
RefSeq (mRNA)	NM_004147	NM_007879
RefSeq (protein)	NP_004138	NP_031905
Location (UCSC)	Chr 22: 31.4 – 31.53 Mb	Chr 11: 3.14 – 3.22 Mb
PubMed search
- Wikidata
View/Edit Human	View/Edit Mouse

Developmentally-regulated GTP-binding protein 1 is a protein that in humans is encoded by the DRG1 gene.
