= NFX1 =

Protein-coding gene in the species Homo sapiens

Identifiers
- Aliases: NFX1, NFX2, TEG-42, Tex42, nuclear transcription factor, X-box binding 1
- External IDs: OMIM: 603255; MGI: 1921414; GeneCards: NFX1

Gene location (Human)
Chr.	Chromosome 9 (human)
Band	9p13.3	Start	33,290,512 bp
Band	9p13.3	End	33,371,157 bp

Gene location (Mouse)
Chr.	Chromosome 4 (mouse)
Band	4 A5|4 20.72 cM	Start	40,970,906 bp
Band	4 A5|4 20.72 cM	End	41,025,993 bp
RNA expression pattern
Bgee	Human / Mouse (ortholog); Top expressed in: buccal mucosa cell; skin of hip; tail of epididymis; caput epididymis; corpus epididymis; endothelial cell; right ventricle; oral cavity; skin of thigh; biceps brachii / Top expressed in: cumulus cell; primitive streak; epiblast; gastrula; seminal vesicula; dermis; neural layer of retina; hair follicle; superior frontal gyrus; aortic valve; More reference expression data
BioGPS	n/a
Gene ontology
Molecular function	DNA-binding transcription factor activity; DNA binding; DNA-binding transcription repressor activity, RNA polymerase II-specific; zinc ion binding; ligase activity; RNA polymerase II transcription regulatory region sequence-specific DNA binding; metal ion binding; nucleic acid binding; RNA binding; DNA-binding transcription factor activity, RNA polymerase II-specific; transferase activity; ubiquitin protein ligase activity
Cellular component	plasma membrane; nucleolus; nucleus; cytosol
Biological process	inflammatory response; viral process; regulation of transcription, DNA-templated; negative regulation of transcription by RNA polymerase II; transcription by RNA polymerase II; negative regulation of MHC class II biosynthetic process; transcription, DNA-templated; protein ubiquitination
Sources:Amigo / QuickGO
Orthologs
Databases	NCBI: entry; OMA: entry
Species	Human	Mouse
Entrez	4799	74164
Ensembl	ENSG00000086102	ENSMUSG00000028423
UniProt	Q12986	B1AY10
RefSeq (mRNA)	NM_002504; NM_147133; NM_147134; NM_001318758	NM_001290448; NM_001290449; NM_023739
RefSeq (protein)	NP_001305687; NP_002495; NP_667345	NP_001277377; NP_001277378; NP_076228
Location (UCSC)	Chr 9: 33.29 – 33.37 Mb	Chr 4: 40.97 – 41.03 Mb
PubMed search
- Wikidata
View/Edit Human	View/Edit Mouse

Transcriptional repressor NF-X1 is a protein that in humans is encoded by the NFX1 gene.

MHC class II gene expression is controlled primarily at the transcriptional level by transcription factors that bind to the X and Y boxes, two highly conserved elements in the proximal promoter of MHC class II genes. The protein encoded by this gene is a transcriptional repressor capable of binding to the conserved X box motif of HLA-DRA and other MHC class II genes in vitro. The protein may play a role in regulating the duration of an inflammatory response by limiting the period in which class II MHC molecules are induced by IFN-γ. Three alternative splice variants, each of which encodes a different isoform, have been identified.
