= PWP2 =

Protein-coding gene in the species Homo sapiens

Identifiers
- Aliases: PWP2, EHOC-17, PWP2H, UTP1, PWP2 periodic tryptophan protein homolog (yeast), small subunit processome component, PWP2 small subunit processome component
- External IDs: OMIM: 601475; MGI: 1341200; GeneCards: PWP2

Gene location (Human)
Chr.	Chromosome 21 (human)
Band	21q22.3	Start	44,107,373 bp
Band	21q22.3	End	44,131,181 bp

Gene location (Mouse)
Chr.	Chromosome 10 (mouse)
Band	10 C1|10 39.72 cM	Start	78,006,743 bp
Band	10 C1|10 39.72 cM	End	78,020,983 bp
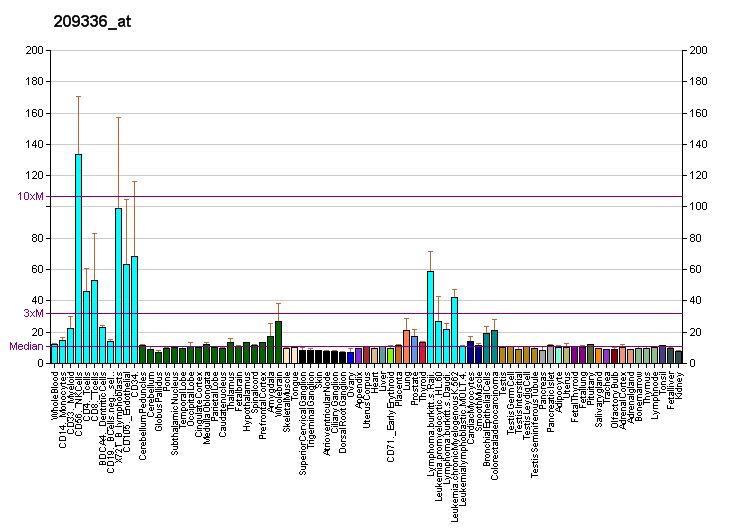
RNA expression pattern
Bgee	Human / Mouse (ortholog); Top expressed in: stromal cell of endometrium; corpus callosum; mucosa of transverse colon; gastric mucosa; gonad; skeletal muscle tissue; sural nerve; prefrontal cortex; right adrenal gland; blood / Top expressed in: primitive streak; epiblast; primary oocyte; otic vesicle; secondary oocyte; otic placode; cumulus cell; zygote; ventricular zone; yolk sac; More reference expression data
BioGPS	More reference expression data
Gene ontology
Molecular function	snoRNA binding; RNA binding
Cellular component	Pwp2p-containing subcomplex of 90S preribosome; nucleus; nucleolus; small-subunit processome; nucleoplasm
Biological process	ribosomal small subunit assembly; maturation of SSU-rRNA from tricistronic rRNA transcript (SSU-rRNA, 5.8S rRNA, LSU-rRNA); rRNA processing
Sources:Amigo / QuickGO
Orthologs
Databases	NCBI: entry; OMA: entry
Species	Human	Mouse
Entrez	5822	110816
Ensembl	ENSG00000241945	ENSMUSG00000032834
UniProt	Q15269	Q8BU03
RefSeq (mRNA)	NM_005049	NM_029546
RefSeq (protein)	NP_005040	NP_083822
Location (UCSC)	Chr 21: 44.11 – 44.13 Mb	Chr 10: 78.01 – 78.02 Mb
PubMed search
- Wikidata
View/Edit Human	View/Edit Mouse

Periodic tryptophan protein 2 homolog is a protein that in humans is encoded by the PWP2 gene.

== Function ==
This protein is involved in the assembly of small subunit of ribosome.
