= JMJD1C =

Protein-coding gene in the species Homo sapiens

Identifiers
- Aliases: JMJD1C, TRIP8, TRIP-8, jumonji domain containing 1C, KDM3C
- External IDs: OMIM: 604503; MGI: 1918614; GeneCards: JMJD1C
Available structures
| PDB | Ortholog search: PDBe RCSB |
| PDB | List of PDB id codes 2YPD, 5FZO |

Gene location (Human)
| Chr. | Chromosome 10 (human) |
| Band | 10q21.3 | Start | 63,167,221 bp |
| Band | 10q21.3 | End | 63,521,850 bp |

Gene location (Mouse)
| Chr. | Chromosome 10 (mouse) |
| Band | 10|10 B5.1 | Start | 67,096,125 bp |
| Band | 10|10 B5.1 | End | 67,256,326 bp |
RNA expression pattern
| Bgee | Human / Mouse (ortholog); Top expressed in: Achilles tendon; right hemisphere of cerebellum; mucosa of paranasal sinus; tendon of biceps brachii; jejunal mucosa; superficial temporal artery; trabecular bone; ventricular zone; right lung; testicle / Top expressed in: uterus; genital tubercle; tail of embryo; granulocyte; cerebellar cortex; epiblast; neural layer of retina; ganglionic eminence; neural tube; ovary; More reference expression data |
| BioGPS | n/a |
Gene ontology
| Molecular function | oxidoreductase activity; protein binding; dioxygenase activity; metal ion binding; thyroid hormone receptor binding; transcription cis-regulatory region binding; chromatin DNA binding; histone H3-methyl-lysine-9 demethylase activity |
| Cellular component | intracellular anatomical structure; nucleoplasm; chromatin; nucleus |
| Biological process | blood coagulation; regulation of transcription, DNA-templated; transcription, DNA-templated; histone H3-K9 demethylation; chromatin organization |
Sources:Amigo / QuickGO
Orthologs
| Databases | NCBI: entry; OMA: entry |
| Species | Human | Mouse |
| Entrez | 221037 | 108829 |
| Ensembl | ENSG00000171988 | ENSMUSG00000037876 |
| UniProt | Q15652 | Q69ZK6 |
| RefSeq (mRNA) | NM_001282948; NM_004241; NM_032776; NM_001318153; NM_001318154 NM_001322252; NM_001322254; NM_001322258 | NM_001242396; NM_207221 |
| RefSeq (protein) | NP_001269877; NP_001305082; NP_001305083; NP_001309181; NP_001309183 NP_001309187; NP_116165 | NP_001229325; NP_997104 |
| Location (UCSC) | Chr 10: 63.17 – 63.52 Mb | Chr 10: 67.1 – 67.26 Mb |
| PubMed search |
- Wikidata
| View/Edit Human | View/Edit Mouse |

Jumonji domain containing 1C is a protein that in humans is encoded by the JMJD1C gene.

== Function ==
The protein encoded by this gene interacts with thyroid hormone receptors and contains a jumonji domain. It is a candidate histone demethylase and is thought to be a coactivator for key transcription factors. It plays a role in the DNA-damage response pathway by demethylating the mediator of DNA damage checkpoint 1 (MDC1) protein, and is required for the survival of acute myeloid leukemia. Mutations in this gene are associated with Rett syndrome and intellectual disability.

== Epigenetic regulation of spermatogenesis ==
Jmjd1C belongs to the Jmjd1 family genes. Jmjd1C encodes a histone H3K9 demethylase. In addition, the JMJD1c gene has a role in mouse spermatogenesis. In male homozygous Jmjd1C mouse knockouts are unable to produce sperm. The mechanism may be the absence of interaction between JMJD1C with JMJD1c's partner proteins, for example, MDC1 and HSP90.
