= TNRC6A =

Protein-coding gene in the species Homo sapiens

Identifiers
- Aliases: TNRC6A, CAGH26, GW1, GW182, TNRC6, trinucleotide repeat containing 6A, FAME6, trinucleotide repeat containing adaptor 6A
- External IDs: OMIM: 610739; MGI: 2385292; HomoloGene: 41399; GeneCards: TNRC6A; OMA:TNRC6A - orthologs

Gene location (Human)
Chr.	Chromosome 16 (human)
Band	16p12.1	Start	24,610,209 bp
Band	16p12.1	End	24,827,632 bp

Gene location (Mouse)
Chr.	Chromosome 7 (mouse)
Band	7|7 F2- F3	Start	122,723,108 bp
Band	7|7 F2- F3	End	122,794,519 bp
RNA expression pattern
Bgee	Human / Mouse (ortholog); Top expressed in: corpus callosum; Achilles tendon; sural nerve; cerebellum; cerebellar hemisphere; right hemisphere of cerebellum; pituitary gland; endometrium; gastric mucosa; left ovary / Top expressed in: ciliary body; Gonadal ridge; retinal pigment epithelium; iris; primitive streak; arcuate nucleus; median eminence; lacrimal gland; ventromedial nucleus; parotid gland; More reference expression data
BioGPS	n/a
Gene ontology
Molecular function	protein binding; nucleic acid binding; RNA binding
Cellular component	cytoplasm; cytosol; Golgi apparatus; intracellular membrane-bounded organelle; P-body; nucleoplasm
Biological process	RNA interference; gene silencing by miRNA; regulation of translation; miRNA-mediated gene silencing by inhibition of translation; Wnt signaling pathway, calcium modulating pathway; gene silencing; regulation of gene silencing by miRNA; regulation of megakaryocyte differentiation; cellular response to starvation; positive regulation of gene expression; negative regulation of gene expression; positive regulation of nuclear-transcribed mRNA poly(A) tail shortening
Sources:Amigo / QuickGO
Orthologs
Species	Human	Mouse
Entrez	27327	233833
Ensembl	ENSG00000090905; ENSG00000288130	ENSMUSG00000052707
UniProt	Q8NDV7	Q3UHK8
RefSeq (mRNA)	NM_014494; NM_001330520; NM_001351850	NM_144925
RefSeq (protein)	NP_001317449; NP_055309; NP_001338779	NP_659174
Location (UCSC)	Chr 16: 24.61 – 24.83 Mb	Chr 7: 122.72 – 122.79 Mb
PubMed search
- Wikidata
View/Edit Human	View/Edit Mouse

Trinucleotide repeat-containing gene 6A protein is a protein that in humans is encoded by the TNRC6A gene.

This gene encodes a member of the trinucleotide repeat containing 6 protein family. The protein functions in post-transcriptional gene silencing through the RNA interference (RNAi) and microRNA pathways. The protein associates with messenger RNAs and Argonaute proteins in cytoplasmic bodies known as GW-bodies or P-bodies. Inhibiting expression of this gene delocalizes other GW-body proteins and impairs RNAi and microRNA-induced gene silencing.
