= ZHX3 =

Protein-coding gene in the species Homo sapiens

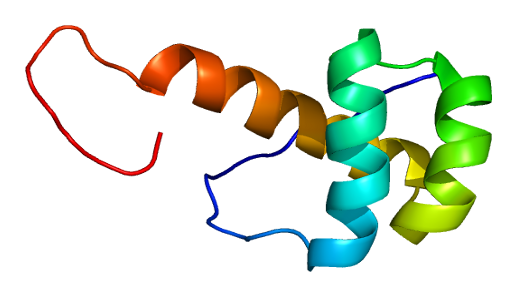

Identifiers
- Aliases: ZHX3, TIX1, zinc fingers and homeoboxes 3
- External IDs: OMIM: 609598; MGI: 2444772; GeneCards: ZHX3
Available structures
PDB	Ortholog search: PDBe RCSB
PDB	List of PDB id codes 2DA5, 2DN0

Gene location (Human)
Chr.	Chromosome 20 (human)
Band	20q12	Start	41,178,448 bp
Band	20q12	End	41,317,672 bp

Gene location (Mouse)
Chr.	Chromosome 2 (mouse)
Band	2|2 H2	Start	160,590,628 bp
Band	2|2 H2	End	160,714,918 bp
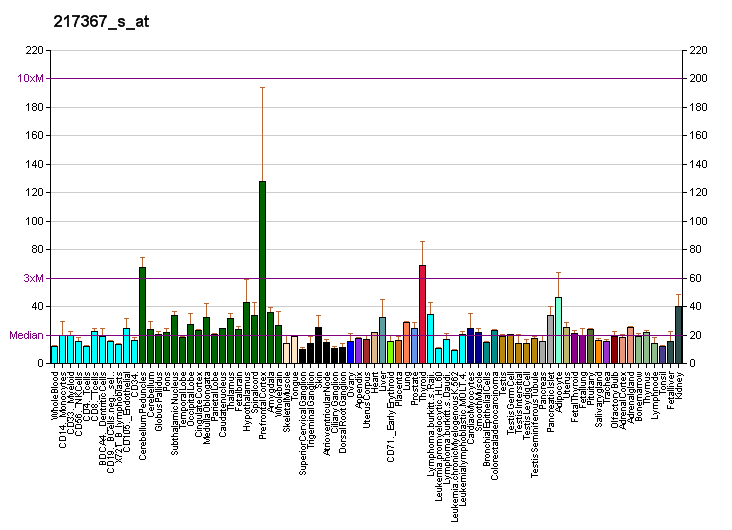

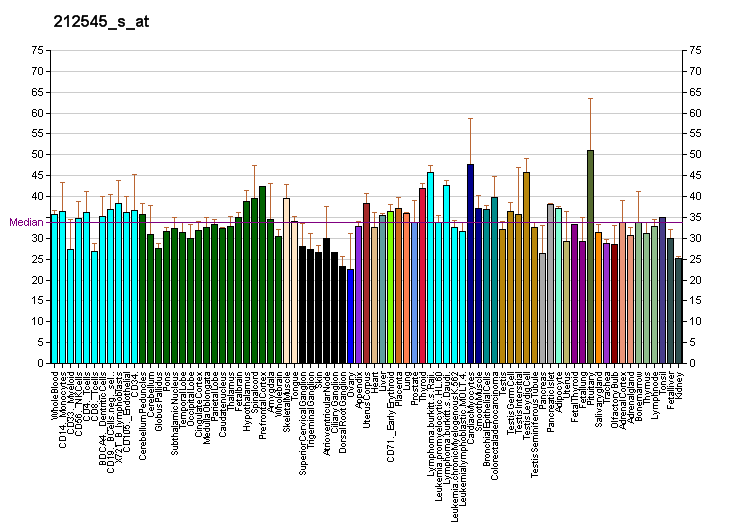
RNA expression pattern
Bgee	Human / Mouse (ortholog); Top expressed in: sural nerve; gastric mucosa; Achilles tendon; ventricular zone; corpus callosum; stromal cell of endometrium; popliteal artery; tibial arteries; internal globus pallidus; nucleus accumbens / Top expressed in: otolith organ; utricle; zygote; secondary oocyte; spermatid; vestibular membrane of cochlear duct; lumbar subsegment of spinal cord; seminiferous tubule; ascending aorta; aortic valve; More reference expression data
BioGPS	More reference expression data
Gene ontology
Molecular function	DNA-binding transcription factor activity; DNA binding; protein binding; protein homodimerization activity; transcription corepressor activity; metal ion binding; protein heterodimerization activity; nucleic acid binding; RNA polymerase II transcription regulatory region sequence-specific DNA binding; DNA-binding transcription factor activity, RNA polymerase II-specific
Cellular component	nucleus; nucleoplasm
Biological process	cell differentiation; positive regulation of osteoblast differentiation; negative regulation of transcription, DNA-templated; regulation of transcription, DNA-templated; negative regulation of transcription by RNA polymerase II; transcription, DNA-templated
Sources:Amigo / QuickGO
Orthologs
Databases	NCBI: entry; OMA: entry
Species	Human	Mouse
Entrez	23051	320799
Ensembl	ENSG00000174306	ENSMUSG00000035877
UniProt	Q9H4I2	Q8C0Q2
RefSeq (mRNA)	NM_015035	NM_177263
RefSeq (protein)	NP_055850	NP_796237
Location (UCSC)	Chr 20: 41.18 – 41.32 Mb	Chr 2: 160.59 – 160.71 Mb
PubMed search
- Wikidata
View/Edit Human	View/Edit Mouse

Zinc fingers and homeoboxes protein 3 is a protein that in humans is encoded by the ZHX3 gene.

This gene encodes a member of the zinc fingers and homeoboxes (ZHX) gene family. The encoded Protein contains two C2H2-type zinc fingers and five Homeodomains and forms a Dimer with itself or with Zinc fingers and homeoboxes family member 1. In the Nucleus, the dimerized protein interacts with the A subunit of the ubiquitous transcription factor nuclear factor-Y and may function as a transcriptional repressor.fx
