= PWP1 =

Protein-coding gene in the species Homo sapiens

Identifiers
- Aliases: PWP1, IEF-SSP-9502, PWP1 homolog, endonuclein
- External IDs: MGI: 1914735; GeneCards: PWP1

Gene location (Mouse)
Chr.	Chromosome 10 (mouse)
Band	10|10 C1	Start	85,665,358 bp
Band	10|10 C1	End	85,724,960 bp
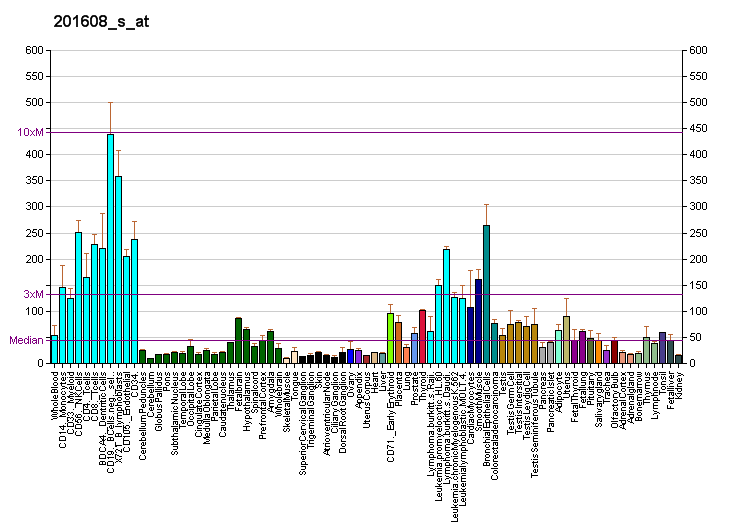

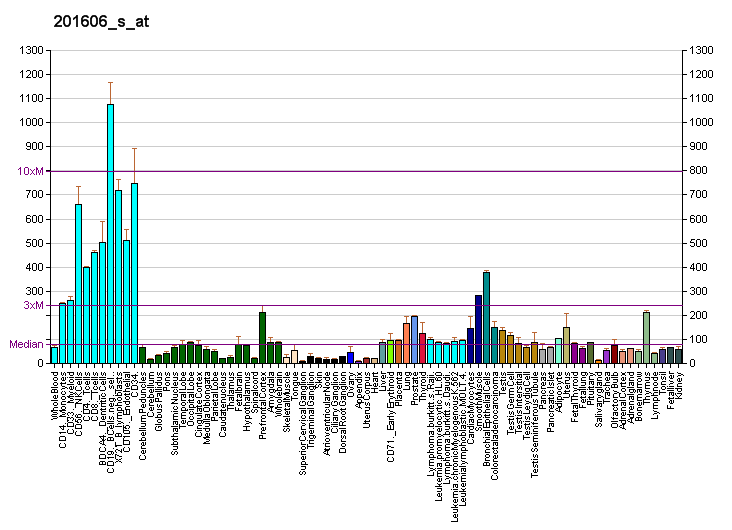

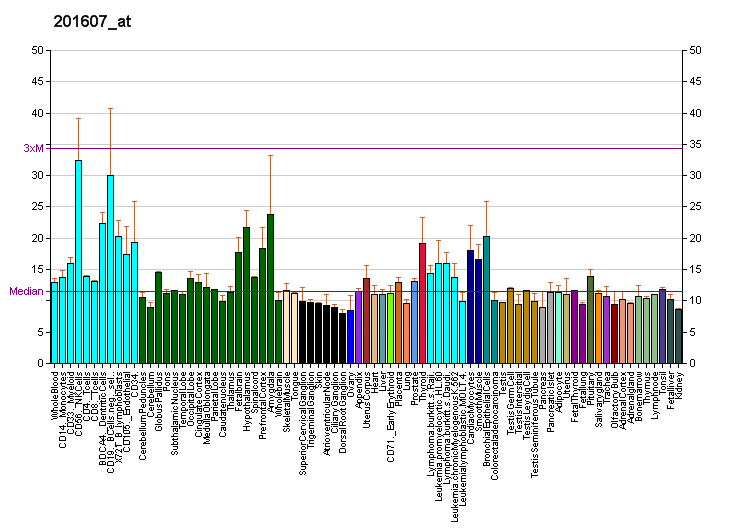
RNA expression pattern
Bgee	Human / Mouse (ortholog); Top expressed in: secondary oocyte; nipple; pylorus; cardia; renal medulla; pericardium; Achilles tendon; vulva; pons; parietal pleura / Top expressed in: primitive streak; abdominal wall; endothelial cell of lymphatic vessel; Paneth cell; spermatocyte; epiblast; medial ganglionic eminence; morula; hair follicle; maxillary prominence; More reference expression data
BioGPS	More reference expression data
Gene ontology
Molecular function	H4K20me3 modified histone binding
Cellular component	nucleus; Golgi apparatus; nucleolus; chromosome
Biological process	transcription, DNA-templated; positive regulation of stem cell differentiation; histone H4-K20 trimethylation; negative regulation of peptidyl-serine phosphorylation of STAT protein; positive regulation of transcription of nucleolar large rRNA by RNA polymerase I; ribosome biogenesis
Sources:Amigo / QuickGO
Orthologs
Databases	NCBI: entry
Species	Human	Mouse
Entrez	11137	103136
Ensembl	n/a	ENSMUSG00000001785
UniProt	Q13610	Q99LL5
RefSeq (mRNA)	NM_007062; NM_001317962; NM_001317963	NM_133993
RefSeq (protein)	NP_001304891; NP_001304892; NP_008993	NP_598754
Location (UCSC)	n/a	Chr 10: 85.67 – 85.72 Mb
PubMed search
- Wikidata
View/Edit Human	View/Edit Mouse

Periodic tryptophan protein 1 homolog is a protein that in humans is encoded by the PWP1 gene.
