= Bicyclononyne =

Names
- IUPAC name bicyclo[6.1.0]non-4-yne

Identifiers
CAS Number	1415580-17-4
3D model (JSmol)	Interactive image
ChemSpider	67177330
PubChem CID	14201804
- InChI: Key: QDNSAFCVPAMWCJ-UHFFFAOYSA-N; InChI=1S/C9H12/c1-2-4-6-9-7-8(9)5-3-1/h8-9H,3-7H2
- SMILES: C1CC2CC2CCC#C1

Properties
Chemical formula	C_{9}H_{12}
Molar mass	120.195 g·mol^{−1}
- Except where otherwise noted, data are given for materials in their standard state (at 25 °C [77 °F], 100 kPa). Infobox references

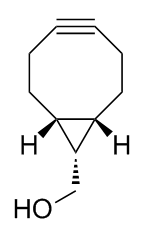
BCN, with free hydroxymethyl group

BCN, also known as bicyclo[6.1.0]non-4-yne, is a copper-free click chemistry probe that enables highly efficient and completely orthogonal bioconjugation to complex macromolecules including peptides, nucleic acids and proteins, including monoclonal antibodies. The most recent and powerful application of this technology has been in the field of antibody-drug conjugates which results in targeted cancer therapeutics that have an improved therapeutic index, meaning they are more effective and better tolerated. BCN is well-suited for aqueous bioconjugations due to its high reactivity with its azide counterpart and its high hydrophilicity, relative to other metal-free click chemistry probes.
