= NOL9 =

Protein-coding gene in humans

Identifiers
- Aliases: NOL9, Grc3, NET6, nucleolar protein 9
- External IDs: MGI: 1921285; GeneCards: NOL9
Enzyme activity
EC #	BRENDA	ExPASy	KEGG	MetaCyc
2.7.1.78	↗	↗	↗	↗

Gene location (Human)
Chr.	Chromosome 1 (human)
Band	1p36.31	Start	6,521,347 bp
Band	1p36.31	End	6,554,513 bp

Gene location (Mouse)
Chr.	Chromosome 4 (mouse)
Band	4|4 E2	Start	152,123,778 bp
Band	4|4 E2	End	152,145,951 bp
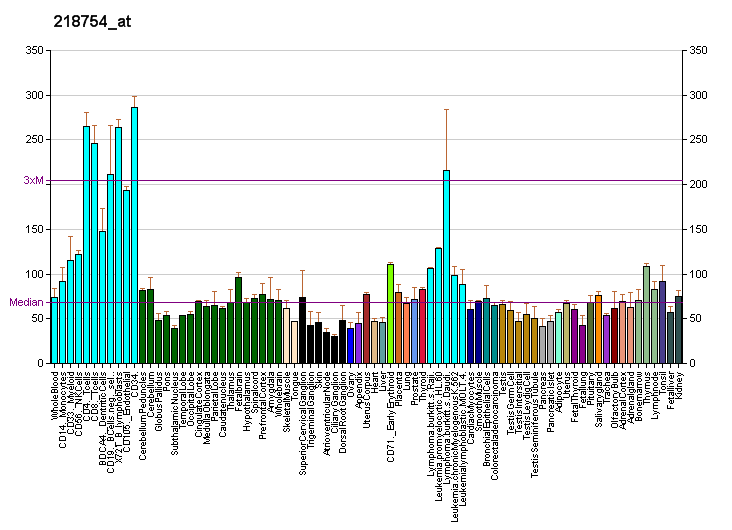
RNA expression pattern
Bgee	Human / Mouse (ortholog); Top expressed in: tibialis anterior muscle; internal globus pallidus; nipple; Skeletal muscle tissue of rectus abdominis; deltoid muscle; biceps brachii; periodontal fiber; quadriceps femoris muscle; Brodmann area 46; vastus lateralis muscle / Top expressed in: lumbar subsegment of spinal cord; tail of embryo; epiblast; zygote; yolk sac; genital tubercle; primitive streak; secondary oocyte; hand; morula; More reference expression data
BioGPS	More reference expression data
Gene ontology
Molecular function	transferase activity; nucleotide binding; polynucleotide 5'-hydroxyl-kinase activity; protein binding; ATP binding; RNA binding; kinase activity
Cellular component	membrane; nucleus; nucleoplasm; nucleolus; intermediate filament cytoskeleton
Biological process	cleavage in ITS2 between 5.8S rRNA and LSU-rRNA of tricistronic rRNA transcript (SSU-rRNA, 5.8S rRNA, LSU-rRNA); maturation of 5.8S rRNA; phosphorylation; rRNA processing
Sources:Amigo / QuickGO
Orthologs
Databases	NCBI: entry; OMA: entry
Species	Human	Mouse
Entrez	79707	74035
Ensembl	ENSG00000162408	ENSMUSG00000028948
UniProt	Q5SY16	Q3TZX8
RefSeq (mRNA)	NM_024654	NM_001159599; NM_028727; NM_001378856
RefSeq (protein)	NP_078930	NP_001153071; NP_083003; NP_001365785
Location (UCSC)	Chr 1: 6.52 – 6.55 Mb	Chr 4: 152.12 – 152.15 Mb
PubMed search
- Wikidata
View/Edit Human	View/Edit Mouse

Nucleolar protein 9 is a protein that in humans is encoded by the NOL9 gene.
