= RBM22 =

Protein-coding gene in the species Homo sapiens

Identifiers
- Aliases: RBM22, Cwc2, ZC3H16, fSAP47, RNA binding motif protein 22
- External IDs: OMIM: 612430; MGI: 1914060; GeneCards: RBM22
Available structures
PDB	Ortholog search: PDBe RCSB
PDB	List of PDB id codes 2YTC

Gene location (Human)
Chr.	Chromosome 5 (human)
Band	5q33.1	Start	150,690,792 bp
Band	5q33.1	End	150,701,077 bp

Gene location (Mouse)
Chr.	Chromosome 18 (mouse)
Band	18|18 D3	Start	60,693,808 bp
Band	18|18 D3	End	60,705,882 bp
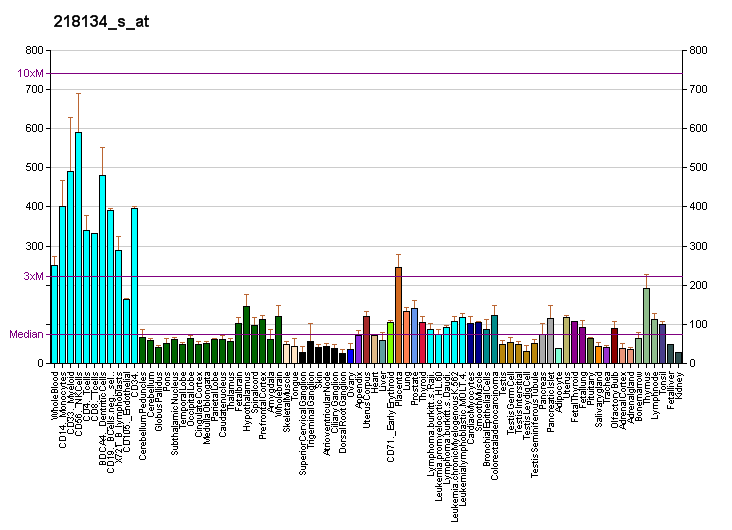
RNA expression pattern
Bgee	Human / Mouse (ortholog); Top expressed in: tibia; parietal pleura; germinal epithelium; visceral pleura; amniotic fluid; ganglionic eminence; blood; ventricular zone; secondary oocyte; granulocyte / Top expressed in: zygote; ventricular zone; abdominal wall; thymus; epiblast; tail of embryo; ganglionic eminence; neural layer of retina; genital tubercle; secondary oocyte; More reference expression data
BioGPS	More reference expression data
Gene ontology
Molecular function	metal ion binding; calcium-dependent protein binding; nucleic acid binding; pre-mRNA binding; U6 snRNA binding; structural constituent of nuclear pore; RNA binding; protein binding
Cellular component	cytoplasm; catalytic step 2 spliceosome; U2-type catalytic step 1 spliceosome; U2-type catalytic step 2 spliceosome; Prp19 complex; spliceosomal complex; nucleus; nucleoplasm
Biological process	positive regulation of intracellular protein transport; mRNA processing; spliceosomal snRNP assembly; RNA splicing; mRNA cis splicing, via spliceosome; positive regulation of RNA splicing; mRNA splicing, via spliceosome; transport; positive regulation of protein import into nucleus; positive regulation of protein export from nucleus
Sources:Amigo / QuickGO
Orthologs
Databases	NCBI: entry; OMA: entry
Species	Human	Mouse
Entrez	55696	66810
Ensembl	ENSG00000086589	ENSMUSG00000024604
UniProt	Q9NW64	Q8BHS3
RefSeq (mRNA)	NM_018047	NM_025776
RefSeq (protein)	NP_060517	NP_080052
Location (UCSC)	Chr 5: 150.69 – 150.7 Mb	Chr 18: 60.69 – 60.71 Mb
PubMed search
- Wikidata
View/Edit Human	View/Edit Mouse

Pre-mRNA-splicing factor RBM22 is a protein that in humans is encoded by the RBM22 gene.
