= USP47 =

Protein-coding gene in the species Homo sapiens

Identifiers
- Aliases: USP47, TRFP, ubiquitin specific peptidase 47
- External IDs: OMIM: 614460; MGI: 1922246; GeneCards: USP47
Enzyme activity
| EC # | BRENDA | ExPASy | KEGG | MetaCyc |
|---|---|---|---|---|
| 3.4.19.12 | ↗ | ↗ | ↗ | ↗ |

Gene location (Human)
| Chr. | Chromosome 11 (human) |
| Band | 11p15.3 | Start | 11,841,423 bp |
| Band | 11p15.3 | End | 11,959,323 bp |

Gene location (Mouse)
| Chr. | Chromosome 7 (mouse) |
| Band | 7|7 F1 | Start | 111,622,711 bp |
| Band | 7|7 F1 | End | 111,710,868 bp |
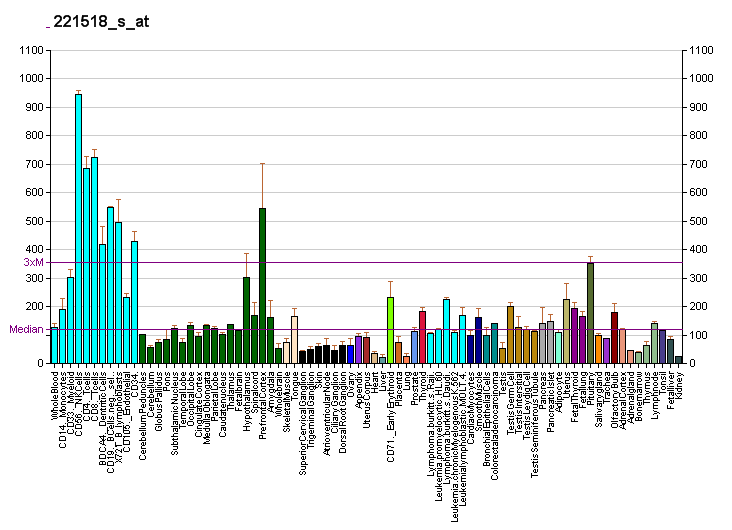
RNA expression pattern
| Bgee | Human / Mouse (ortholog); Top expressed in: tendon of biceps brachii; internal globus pallidus; endothelial cell; glutes; secondary oocyte; seminal vesicula; vena cava; corpus callosum; biceps brachii; periodontal fiber / Top expressed in: ciliary body; vastus lateralis muscle; triceps brachii muscle; spermatid; gastrocnemius muscle; tibialis anterior muscle; medial head of gastrocnemius muscle; ankle; spermatocyte; muscle of thigh; More reference expression data |
| BioGPS | More reference expression data |
Gene ontology
| Molecular function | WD40-repeat domain binding; peptidase activity; hydrolase activity; cysteine-type peptidase activity; thiol-dependent deubiquitinase; protein binding; deubiquitinase activity; cysteine-type endopeptidase activity |
| Cellular component | cytoplasm; SCF ubiquitin ligase complex; nucleoplasm; cytosol |
| Biological process | ubiquitin-dependent protein catabolic process; proteolysis; negative regulation of apoptotic process; cellular response to UV; negative regulation of intrinsic apoptotic signaling pathway in response to DNA damage; DNA repair; positive regulation of cell growth; monoubiquitinated protein deubiquitination; base-excision repair; negative regulation of G2/M transition of mitotic cell cycle; negative regulation of transcription, DNA-templated; negative regulation of cysteine-type endopeptidase activity involved in apoptotic process; cellular response to DNA damage stimulus; protein deubiquitination; positive regulation of canonical Wnt signaling pathway; regulation of protein stability |
Sources:Amigo / QuickGO
Orthologs
| Databases | NCBI: entry; OMA: entry |
| Species | Human | Mouse |
| Entrez | 55031 | 74996 |
| Ensembl | ENSG00000170242 | ENSMUSG00000059263 |
| UniProt | Q96K76 | Q8BY87 |
| RefSeq (mRNA) | NM_001282659; NM_017944; NM_001330208 | NM_133758; NM_177249; NM_001357952 |
| RefSeq (protein) | NP_001269588; NP_001317137; NP_060414; NP_001359020; NP_001359021 NP_001359022; NP_001359023; NP_001359024; NP_001359025; NP_001359026; NP_001359027; NP_001359028; NP_001359029; NP_001359030; NP_001359031; NP_001359032 | NP_598519; NP_796223; NP_001344881; NP_001390423 |
| Location (UCSC) | Chr 11: 11.84 – 11.96 Mb | Chr 7: 111.62 – 111.71 Mb |
| PubMed search |
- Wikidata
| View/Edit Human | View/Edit Mouse |

Ubiquitin carboxyl-terminal hydrolase 47 is an enzyme that in humans is encoded by the USP47 gene.
