= Nucleoporin p58/p45 =

Protein-coding gene in the species Homo sapiens

NUP58
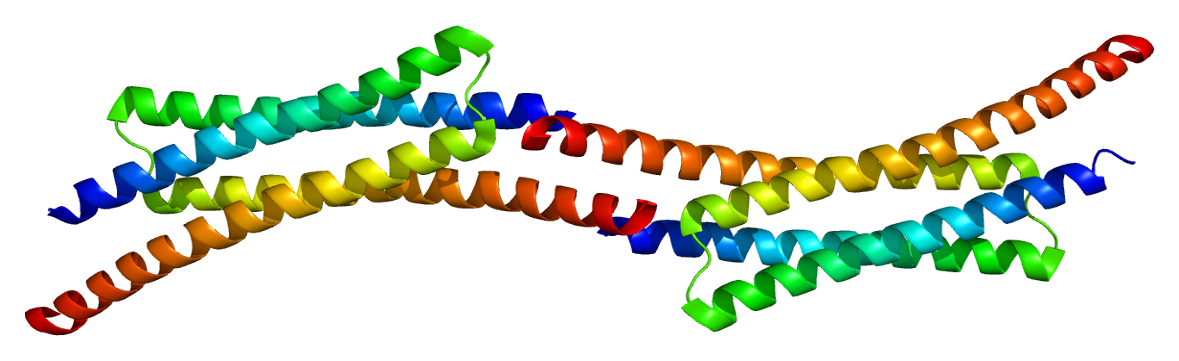

Identifiers
- Aliases: NUP58, PRO2463, NUPL1, NUP45, nucleoporin 58kDa, nucleoporin 58
- External IDs: OMIM: 607615; MGI: 1919094; GeneCards: NUP58
Available structures
PDB	Ortholog search: PDBe RCSB
PDB	List of PDB id codes 4JO7, 4JO9, 4JQ5, 5IJN, 5IJO

Gene location (Human)
Chr.	Chromosome 13 (human)
Band	13q12.13	Start	25,301,152 bp
Band	13q12.13	End	25,365,390 bp

Gene location (Mouse)
Chr.	Chromosome 14 (mouse)
Band	14|14 D1	Start	60,442,731 bp
Band	14|14 D1	End	60,488,956 bp
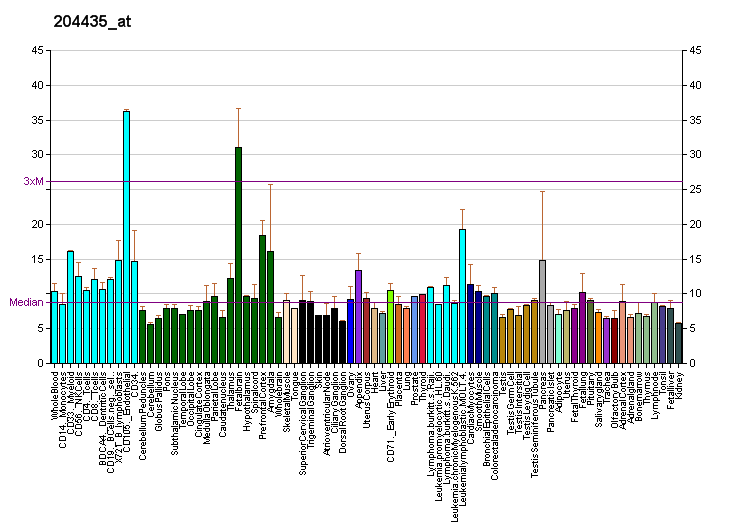
RNA expression pattern
Bgee	Human / Mouse (ortholog); Top expressed in: gonad; Achilles tendon; right testis; testicle; left testis; ganglionic eminence; ventricular zone; monocyte; anterior pituitary; cartilage tissue / Top expressed in: cumulus cell; condyle; primitive streak; hair follicle; conjunctival fornix; fossa; Gonadal ridge; ureter; trigeminal ganglion; Paneth cell; More reference expression data
BioGPS	More reference expression data
Gene ontology
Molecular function	protein binding; nuclear localization sequence binding; structural constituent of nuclear pore
Cellular component	nuclear membrane; nuclear envelope; membrane; nucleus; nuclear pore; protein-containing complex; host cell
Biological process	mRNA transport; protein heterotetramerization; protein heterooligomerization; nucleocytoplasmic transport; regulation of protein import into nucleus; protein transport; viral process; protein homooligomerization; mRNA export from nucleus; protein import into nucleus; protein heterotrimerization; regulation of glycolytic process; tRNA export from nucleus; protein sumoylation; viral transcription; regulation of gene silencing by miRNA; intracellular transport of virus; regulation of cellular response to heat
Sources:Amigo / QuickGO
Orthologs
Databases	NCBI: entry; OMA: entry
Species	Human	Mouse
Entrez	9818	71844
Ensembl	ENSG00000139496	ENSMUSG00000114797
UniProt	Q9BVL2	Q8R332
RefSeq (mRNA)	NM_001008564; NM_001008565; NM_014089; NM_014778	NM_170591; NM_001362439; NM_001362440
RefSeq (protein)	NP_001008564; NP_054808	NP_733479; NP_001349368; NP_001349369
Location (UCSC)	Chr 13: 25.3 – 25.37 Mb	Chr 14: 60.44 – 60.49 Mb
PubMed search
- Wikidata
View/Edit Human	View/Edit Mouse

Nucleoporin p58/p45 is a protein that in humans is encoded by the NUP58 gene (previously NUPL1). The rat version of this gene produces distinct p45 and p58 isoforms (hence the name), but no analog of p45 has been found in humans yet.

This gene encodes a member of the nucleoporin family that shares 87% sequence identity with rat nucleoporin p58. The protein is localized to the nuclear rim and is a component of the nuclear pore complex (NPC).

All molecules entering or leaving the nucleus either diffuse through or are actively transported by the NPC. Alternate transcriptional splice variants, encoding different isoforms, have been characterized.
