= Survival motor neuron domain containing 1 =

Protein-coding gene in the species Homo sapiens

SMNDC1

Identifiers
- Aliases: SMNDC1, SMNR, SPF30, TDRD16C, Survival motor neuron domain containing 1
- External IDs: OMIM: 603519; MGI: 1923729; GeneCards: SMNDC1
Available structures
PDB	Ortholog search: PDBe RCSB
PDB	List of PDB id codes 4A4F, 4A4H

Gene location (Human)
Chr.	Chromosome 10 (human)
Band	10q25.2	Start	110,290,730 bp
Band	10q25.2	End	110,304,938 bp

Gene location (Mouse)
Chr.	Chromosome 19 (mouse)
Band	19|19 D2	Start	53,367,821 bp
Band	19|19 D2	End	53,379,009 bp
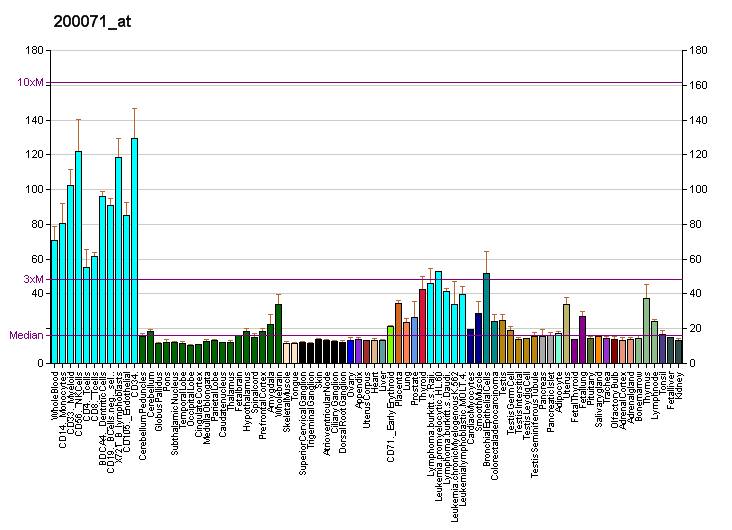
RNA expression pattern
Bgee	Human / Mouse (ortholog); Top expressed in: amniotic fluid; buccal mucosa cell; germinal epithelium; cartilage tissue; gingival epithelium; parietal pleura; retinal pigment epithelium; jejunal mucosa; palpebral conjunctiva; biceps brachii / Top expressed in: cumulus cell; endocardial cushion; plantaris muscle; granulocyte; epiblast; atrioventricular valve; migratory enteric neural crest cell; abdominal wall; cardiac muscle tissue of left ventricle; primitive streak; More reference expression data
BioGPS	More reference expression data
Gene ontology
Molecular function	protein binding; RNA binding
Cellular component	spliceosomal complex; Cajal body; cytoplasm; nucleus; nuclear speck; nucleoplasm
Biological process	RNA splicing; mRNA processing; RNA splicing, via transesterification reactions; apoptotic process; mRNA splicing, via spliceosome
Sources:Amigo / QuickGO
Orthologs
Databases	NCBI: entry; OMA: entry
Species	Human	Mouse
Entrez	10285	76479
Ensembl	ENSG00000119953	ENSMUSG00000025024
UniProt	O75940	Q8BGT7
RefSeq (mRNA)	NM_005871	NM_172429; NM_001356986
RefSeq (protein)	NP_005862	NP_766017; NP_001343915
Location (UCSC)	Chr 10: 110.29 – 110.3 Mb	Chr 19: 53.37 – 53.38 Mb
PubMed search
- Wikidata
View/Edit Human	View/Edit Mouse

Survival of motor neuron-related-splicing factor 30 (SMNDC1) is a protein that in humans is encoded by the SMNDC1 gene.

SMNDC1 is an important splicing regulator and is itself regulated by alternative splicing via inclusion a highly conserved poison exon.
