= HNRPA3 =

Protein-coding gene in the species Homo sapiens

HNRNPA3

Identifiers
- Aliases: HNRNPA3, 2610510D13Rik, D10S102, FBRNP, HNRPA3, heterogeneous nuclear ribonucleoprotein A3
- External IDs: OMIM: 605372; MGI: 1917171; GeneCards: HNRNPA3

Gene location (Human)
Chr.	Chromosome 2 (human)
Band	2q31.2	Start	177,212,563 bp
Band	2q31.2	End	177,223,958 bp

Gene location (Mouse)
Chr.	Chromosome 2 (mouse)
Band	2|2 C3	Start	75,489,605 bp
Band	2|2 C3	End	75,499,751 bp
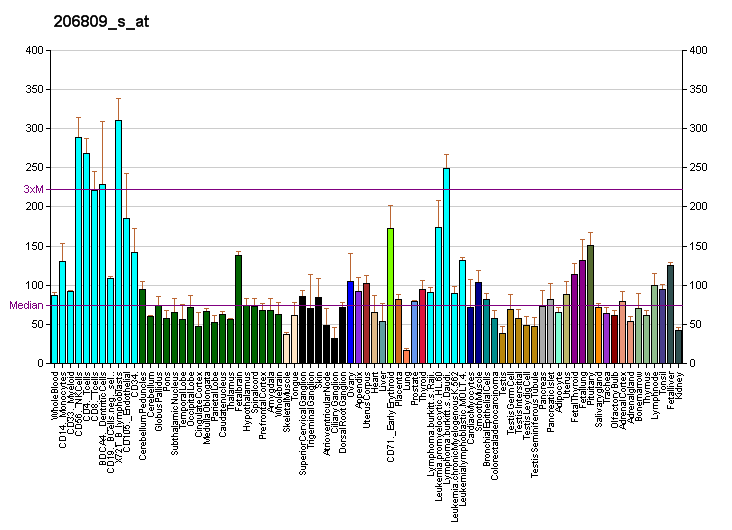

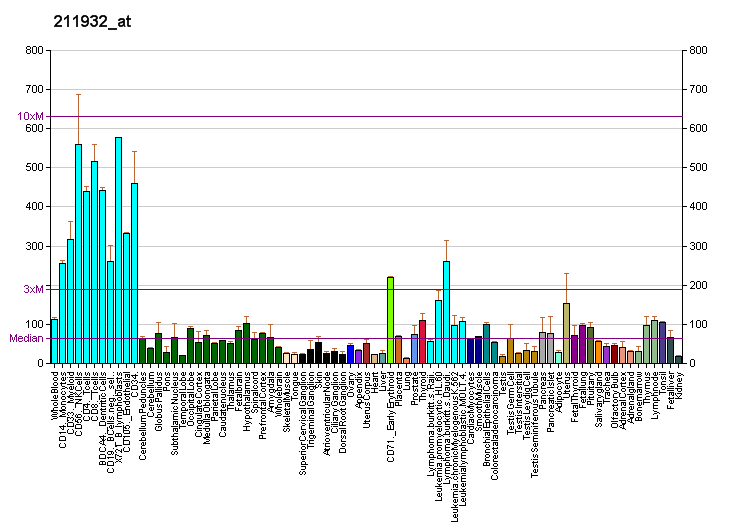

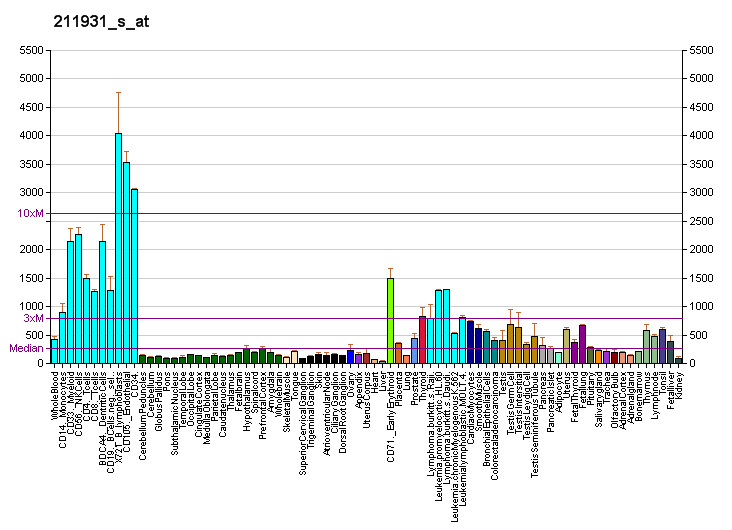
RNA expression pattern
Bgee	Human / Mouse (ortholog); Top expressed in: ganglionic eminence; ventricular zone; right testis; left testis; monocyte; Brodmann area 23; left ovary; left lobe of thyroid gland; right lobe of thyroid gland; epithelium of colon / Top expressed in: tail of embryo; neural layer of retina; ventricular zone; habenula; dentate gyrus of hippocampal formation granule cell; lobe of cerebellum; cerebellar vermis; superior cervical ganglion; ureter; substantia nigra; More reference expression data
BioGPS	More reference expression data
Gene ontology
Molecular function	RNA transmembrane transporter activity; protein binding; mRNA binding; nucleic acid binding; RNA binding
Cellular component	cytoplasm; messenger ribonucleoprotein complex; neuron projection; ribonucleoprotein granule; catalytic step 2 spliceosome; spliceosomal complex; nucleus; nucleoplasm; postsynaptic density; ribonucleoprotein complex
Biological process	mRNA splicing, via spliceosome; mRNA processing; mRNA transport; RNA splicing; RNA metabolic process
Sources:Amigo / QuickGO
Orthologs
Databases	NCBI: entry; OMA: entry
Species	Human	Mouse
Entrez	220988	229279
Ensembl	ENSG00000170144	ENSMUSG00000059005
UniProt	P51991	Q8BG05
RefSeq (mRNA)	NM_001330247; NM_001330248; NM_001330249; NM_001330250; NM_001330251 NM_194247; NM_001395170	NM_053263; NM_146130; NM_198090; NM_001359971
RefSeq (protein)	NP_001317176; NP_001317177; NP_001317178; NP_001317179; NP_001317180 NP_919223	NP_444493; NP_666242; NP_932758; NP_001346900
Location (UCSC)	Chr 2: 177.21 – 177.22 Mb	Chr 2: 75.49 – 75.5 Mb
PubMed search
- Wikidata
View/Edit Human	View/Edit Mouse

Heterogeneous nuclear ribonucleoprotein A3 is a protein that in humans is encoded by the HNRNPA3 gene.
