= ZNF8 =

Protein-coding gene in the species Homo sapiens

Identifiers
- Aliases: ZNF8, HF.18, Zfp128, zinc finger protein 8
- External IDs: OMIM: 194532; MGI: 2389445; GeneCards: ZNF8

Gene location (Human)
Chr.	Chromosome 19 (human)
Band	19q13.43	Start	58,278,955 bp
Band	19q13.43	End	58,302,791 bp

Gene location (Mouse)
Chr.	Chromosome 7 (mouse)
Band	7|7 A1	Start	12,615,104 bp
Band	7|7 A1	End	12,627,349 bp
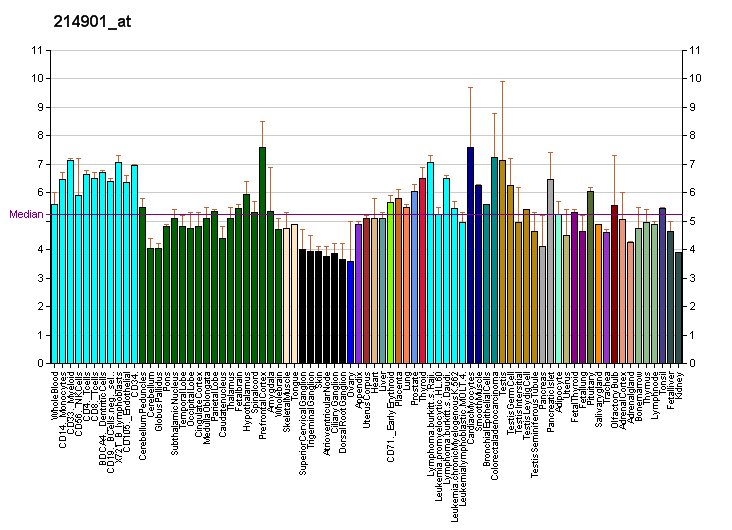
RNA expression pattern
Bgee	Human / Mouse (ortholog); Top expressed in: gonad; ganglionic eminence; ventricular zone; caput epididymis; tail of epididymis; testicle; corpus epididymis; cartilage tissue; stromal cell of endometrium; retinal pigment epithelium / Top expressed in: otolith organ; hand; utricle; spermatocyte; Rostral migratory stream; seminiferous tubule; renal corpuscle; medial ganglionic eminence; substantia nigra; foot; More reference expression data
BioGPS	More reference expression data
Gene ontology
Molecular function	DNA binding; zinc ion binding; metal ion binding; nucleic acid binding
Cellular component	intracellular anatomical structure; nucleus
Biological process	regulation of transcription, DNA-templated; negative regulation of transcription by RNA polymerase II; BMP signaling pathway; transcription, DNA-templated
Sources:Amigo / QuickGO
Orthologs
Databases	NCBI: entry; OMA: entry
Species	Human	Mouse
Entrez	7554	243833
Ensembl	ENSG00000278129	ENSMUSG00000060397
UniProt	P17098	Q8BGV5
RefSeq (mRNA)	NM_021089	NM_153802
RefSeq (protein)	NP_066575	NP_722497
Location (UCSC)	Chr 19: 58.28 – 58.3 Mb	Chr 7: 12.62 – 12.63 Mb
PubMed search
- Wikidata
View/Edit Human	View/Edit Mouse

Zinc finger protein 8 is a protein that in humans is encoded by the ZNF8 gene.
