= ZMYM3 =

Protein-coding gene in the species Homo sapiens

Identifiers
- Aliases: ZMYM3, DXS6673E, MYM, XFIM, ZNF198L2, ZNF261, zinc finger MYM-type containing 3
- External IDs: OMIM: 300061; MGI: 1927231; GeneCards: ZMYM3

Gene location (Human)
Chr.	X chromosome (human)
Band	Xq13.1	Start	71,239,624 bp
Band	Xq13.1	End	71,255,146 bp

Gene location (Mouse)
Chr.	X chromosome (mouse)
Band	X D|X 44.1 cM	Start	101,404,384 bp
Band	X D|X 44.1 cM	End	101,420,849 bp
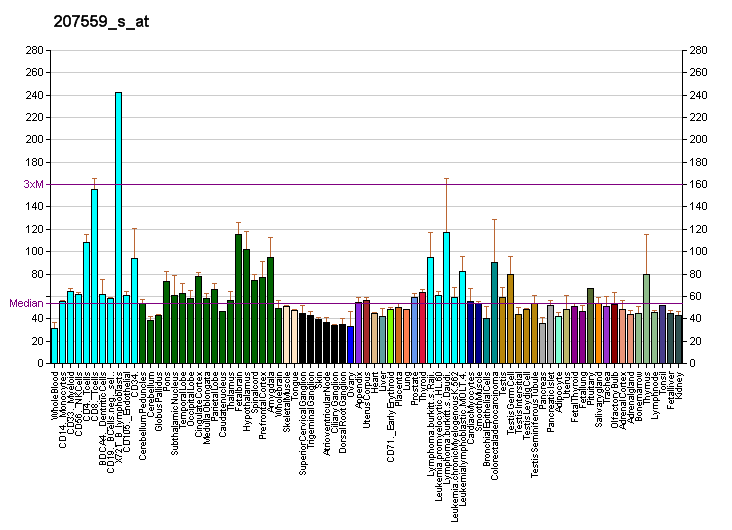
RNA expression pattern
Bgee	Human / Mouse (ortholog); Top expressed in: right adrenal gland; right adrenal cortex; endothelial cell; right ovary; left ovary; left adrenal gland; left adrenal cortex; right uterine tube; embryo; secondary oocyte / Top expressed in: neural layer of retina; superior frontal gyrus; primary visual cortex; genital tubercle; dentate gyrus of hippocampal formation granule cell; cerebellar cortex; dorsomedial hypothalamic nucleus; subiculum; tail of embryo; median eminence; More reference expression data
BioGPS	More reference expression data
Gene ontology
Molecular function	DNA binding; zinc ion binding; metal ion binding; DNA-binding transcription factor activity, RNA polymerase II-specific
Cellular component	nucleus; cytoplasm; nucleoplasm
Biological process	multicellular organism development; regulation of cell morphogenesis; cytoskeleton organization; regulation of transcription by RNA polymerase II
Sources:Amigo / QuickGO
Orthologs
Databases	NCBI: entry; OMA: entry
Species	Human	Mouse
Entrez	9203	56364
Ensembl	ENSG00000147130	ENSMUSG00000031310
UniProt	Q14202	Q9JLM4
RefSeq (mRNA)	NM_001171162; NM_001171163; NM_005096; NM_201599	NM_001177985; NM_001177986; NM_001177987; NM_001177988; NM_019831
RefSeq (protein)	NP_001164633; NP_001164634; NP_005087; NP_963893	NP_001171456; NP_001171457; NP_001171458; NP_001171459; NP_062805
Location (UCSC)	Chr X: 71.24 – 71.26 Mb	Chr X: 101.4 – 101.42 Mb
PubMed search
- Wikidata
View/Edit Human	View/Edit Mouse

Zinc finger MYM-type protein 3 is a protein that in humans is encoded by the ZMYM3 gene.
