= OTUD4 =

Protein-coding gene in the species Homo sapiens

Identifiers
- Aliases: OTUD4, DUBA6, HIN1, HSHIN1, OTU deubiquitinase 4
- External IDs: OMIM: 611744; MGI: 1098801; GeneCards: OTUD4
Enzyme activity
EC #	BRENDA	ExPASy	KEGG	MetaCyc
3.4.19.12	↗	↗	↗	↗

Gene location (Human)
Chr.	Chromosome 4 (human)
Band	4q31.21	Start	145,110,838 bp
Band	4q31.21	End	145,180,589 bp

Gene location (Mouse)
Chr.	Chromosome 8 (mouse)
Band	8 C1|8 37.74 cM	Start	80,366,247 bp
Band	8 C1|8 37.74 cM	End	80,404,353 bp
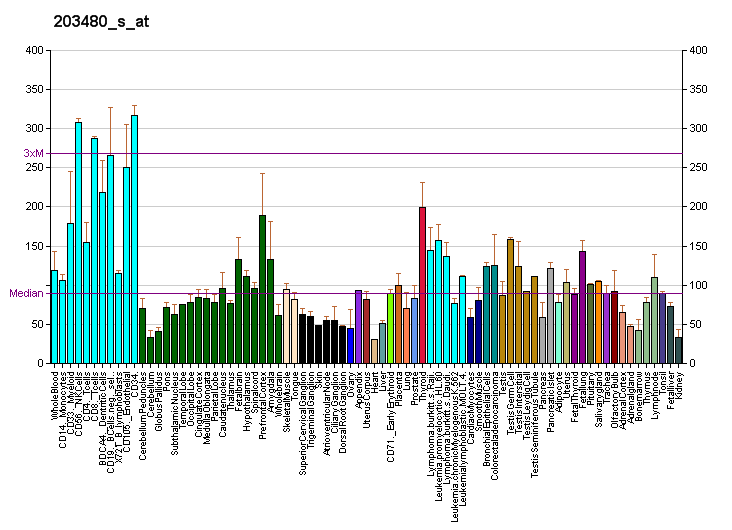

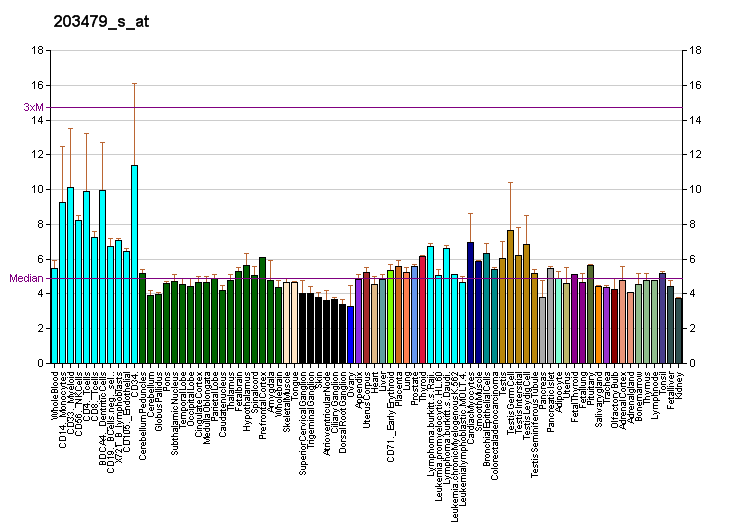

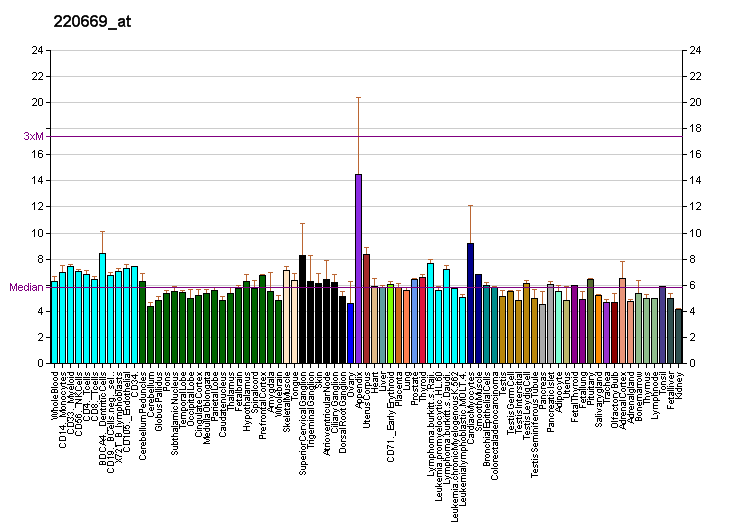
RNA expression pattern
Bgee	Human / Mouse (ortholog); Top expressed in: middle frontal gyrus; Brodmann area 10; paraflocculus of cerebellum; Skeletal muscle tissue of rectus abdominis; frontal pole; thoracic diaphragm; body of tongue; biceps brachii; cerebellar vermis; epithelium of nasopharynx / Top expressed in: otic placode; Ileal epithelium; saccule; otic vesicle; cumulus cell; Gonadal ridge; secondary oocyte; tail of embryo; zygote; atrioventricular valve; More reference expression data
BioGPS	More reference expression data
Gene ontology
Molecular function	thiol-dependent deubiquitinase; peptidase activity; cysteine-type peptidase activity; protein binding; hydrolase activity; RNA binding; molecular adaptor activity; Lys63-specific deubiquitinase activity
Cellular component	cellular component; nucleus; cytoplasm
Biological process	protein K48-linked deubiquitination; proteolysis; immune system process; negative regulation of toll-like receptor signaling pathway; innate immune response; protein K63-linked deubiquitination; positive regulation of DNA demethylation; regulation of protein K48-linked deubiquitination; negative regulation of interleukin-1-mediated signaling pathway; protein deubiquitination
Sources:Amigo / QuickGO
Orthologs
Databases	NCBI: entry; OMA: entry
Species	Human	Mouse
Entrez	54726	73945
Ensembl	ENSG00000164164	ENSMUSG00000036990
UniProt	Q01804	B2RRE7
RefSeq (mRNA)	NM_001102653; NM_017493; NM_199324; NM_001366057; NM_001366058	NM_001081164; NM_001256033
RefSeq (protein)	NP_001096123; NP_059963; NP_001352986; NP_001352987	NP_001074633; NP_001242962
Location (UCSC)	Chr 4: 145.11 – 145.18 Mb	Chr 8: 80.37 – 80.4 Mb
PubMed search
- Wikidata
View/Edit Human	View/Edit Mouse

OTU domain-containing protein 4 is a protein that in humans is encoded by the OTUD4 gene.

Two alternatively spliced transcript variants encoding distinct isoforms have been found for this gene. The smaller protein isoform encoded by the shorter transcript variant is found only in HIV-1 infected cells.
