= TBL3 =

Protein-coding gene in the species Homo sapiens

Identifiers
- Aliases: TBL3, SAZD, UTP13, transducin beta like 3
- External IDs: OMIM: 605915; MGI: 2384863; GeneCards: TBL3

Gene location (Human)
Chr.	Chromosome 16 (human)
Band	16p13.3	Start	1,972,053 bp
Band	16p13.3	End	1,982,929 bp

Gene location (Mouse)
Chr.	Chromosome 17 (mouse)
Band	17|17 A3.3	Start	24,916,923 bp
Band	17|17 A3.3	End	24,926,634 bp
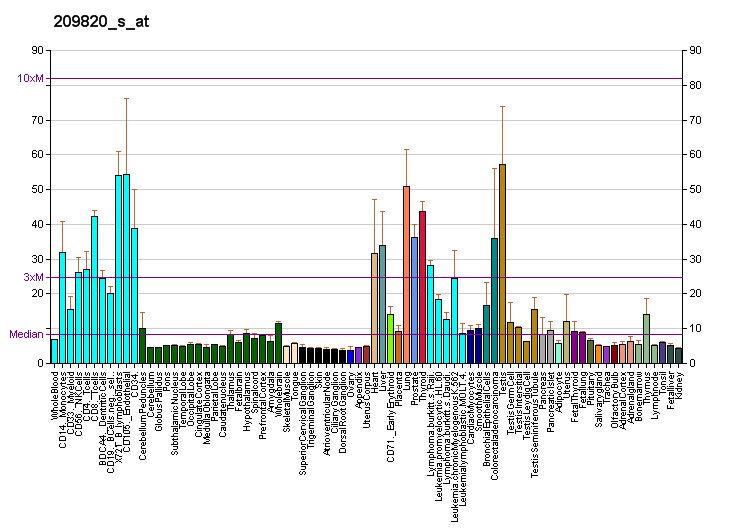
RNA expression pattern
Bgee	Human / Mouse (ortholog); Top expressed in: right testis; left testis; gastrocnemius muscle; apex of heart; muscle of thigh; skin of leg; skin of abdomen; ectocervix; mucosa of transverse colon; right lobe of thyroid gland / Top expressed in: spermatocyte; epiblast; spermatid; morula; embryo; embryo; ventricular zone; Ileal epithelium; maxillary prominence; mandibular prominence; More reference expression data
BioGPS	More reference expression data
Gene ontology
Molecular function	protein binding; snoRNA binding; RNA binding
Cellular component	Pwp2p-containing subcomplex of 90S preribosome; small-subunit processome; nucleolus; nucleus; nucleoplasm
Biological process	maturation of SSU-rRNA from tricistronic rRNA transcript (SSU-rRNA, 5.8S rRNA, LSU-rRNA); rRNA processing
Sources:Amigo / QuickGO
Orthologs
Databases	NCBI: entry; OMA: entry
Species	Human	Mouse
Entrez	10607	213773
Ensembl	ENSG00000183751	ENSMUSG00000040688
UniProt	Q12788	Q8C4J7
RefSeq (mRNA)	NM_006453	NM_145396
RefSeq (protein)	NP_006444	NP_663371
Location (UCSC)	Chr 16: 1.97 – 1.98 Mb	Chr 17: 24.92 – 24.93 Mb
PubMed search
- Wikidata
View/Edit Human	View/Edit Mouse

Transducin beta-like protein 3 is a protein that in humans is encoded by the TBL3 gene.

The protein encoded by this gene has sequence similarity with members of the WD40 repeat-containing protein family. The WD40 group is a large family of proteins, which appear to have a regulatory function. It is believed that the WD40 repeats mediate protein-protein interactions and members of the family are involved in signal transduction, RNA processing, gene regulation, vesicular trafficking, cytoskeletal assembly and may play a role in the control of cytotypic differentiation. This gene has multiple polyadenylation sites. It might have multiple alternatively spliced transcript variants but the variants have not been fully described yet.
