= TAOK1 =

Protein-coding gene in the species Homo sapiens

Identifiers
- Aliases: TAOK1, KFC-B, MAP3K16, MARKK, PSK-2, PSK2, TAO1, hKFC-B, hTAO kinase 1, DDIB
- External IDs: OMIM: 610266; MGI: 1914490; GeneCards: TAOK1
Enzyme activity
EC #	BRENDA	ExPASy	KEGG	MetaCyc
2.7.11.1	↗	↗	↗	↗

Gene location (Human)
Chr.	Chromosome 17 (human)
Band	17q11.2	Start	29,390,363 bp
Band	17q11.2	End	29,551,903 bp

Gene location (Mouse)
Chr.	Chromosome 11 (mouse)
Band	11|11 B5	Start	77,419,988 bp
Band	11|11 B5	End	77,498,641 bp
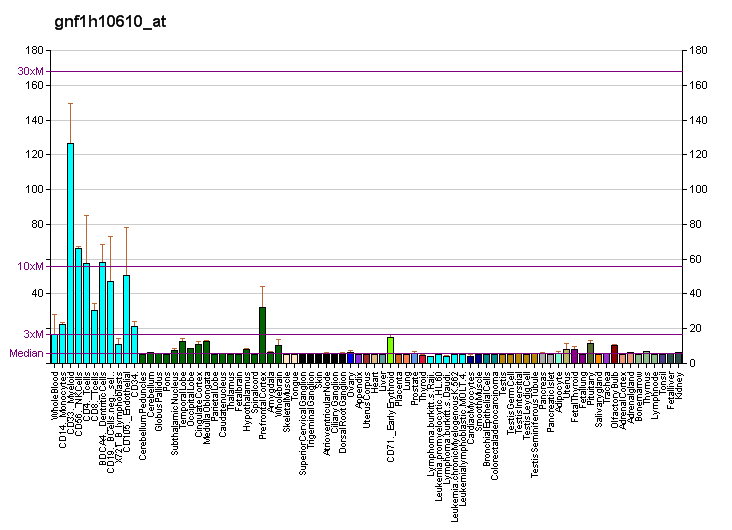
RNA expression pattern
Bgee	Human / Mouse (ortholog); Top expressed in: corpus callosum; globus pallidus; internal globus pallidus; ventral tegmental area; subthalamic nucleus; sural nerve; pars compacta; inferior ganglion of vagus nerve; pons; external globus pallidus / Top expressed in: ventromedial nucleus; lateral septal nucleus; amygdala; lateral geniculate nucleus; olfactory tubercle; anterior amygdaloid area; mammillary body; habenula; inferior colliculi; globus pallidus; More reference expression data
BioGPS	More reference expression data
Gene ontology
Molecular function	transferase activity; protein kinase activity; nucleotide binding; kinase activity; protein serine/threonine kinase activity; protein binding; ATP binding; MAP kinase kinase kinase activity; alpha-tubulin binding; protein serine/threonine kinase activator activity; tau protein binding; beta-tubulin binding; tau-protein kinase activity
Cellular component	cytoplasm; cytosol; extracellular exosome; nucleus; microtubule cytoskeleton; perinuclear region of cytoplasm
Biological process	phosphorylation; execution phase of apoptosis; positive regulation of JNK cascade; cellular response to DNA damage stimulus; protein phosphorylation; spindle checkpoint signaling; regulation of cytoskeleton organization; DNA repair; positive regulation of stress-activated MAPK cascade; apoptotic process; sister chromatid cohesion; MAPK cascade; regulation of mitotic cell cycle; nervous system development; regulation of apoptotic process; microtubule cytoskeleton organization; negative regulation of microtubule depolymerization; mitotic G2 DNA damage checkpoint signaling; signal transduction; stress-activated protein kinase signaling cascade; activation of protein kinase activity; regulation of actin cytoskeleton organization; protein autophosphorylation; neuron cellular homeostasis; regulation of microtubule cytoskeleton organization; positive regulation of protein acetylation
Sources:Amigo / QuickGO
Orthologs
Databases	NCBI: entry; OMA: entry
Species	Human	Mouse
Entrez	57551	216965
Ensembl	ENSG00000160551	ENSMUSG00000017291
UniProt	Q7L7X3	Q5F2E8
RefSeq (mRNA)	NM_020791; NM_025142	NM_144825; NM_001364133; NM_001364134
RefSeq (protein)	NP_065842; NP_079418	NP_659074; NP_001351062; NP_001351063
Location (UCSC)	Chr 17: 29.39 – 29.55 Mb	Chr 11: 77.42 – 77.5 Mb
PubMed search
- Wikidata
View/Edit Human	View/Edit Mouse

Serine/threonine-protein kinase TAO1 is an enzyme that in humans is encoded by the TAOK1 gene.

== Clinical significance ==
Mutations of the TAOK1 gene cause developmental delay with or without intellectual impairment or behavioral abnormalities (DDIB), a condition first described in 2019.
