= HNRNPLL =

Protein-coding gene in the species Homo sapiens

Identifiers
- Aliases: HNRNPLL, HNRPLL, SRRF, heterogeneous nuclear ribonucleoprotein L like
- External IDs: OMIM: 611208; MGI: 1919942; GeneCards: HNRNPLL
Available structures
PDB	Ortholog search: PDBe RCSB
PDB	List of PDB id codes 1WEX, 2E5I

Gene location (Human)
Chr.	Chromosome 2 (human)
Band	2p22.1	Start	38,561,969 bp
Band	2p22.1	End	38,603,586 bp

Gene location (Mouse)
Chr.	Chromosome 17 (mouse)
Band	17|17 E3	Start	80,336,916 bp
Band	17|17 E3	End	80,369,763 bp
RNA expression pattern
Bgee	Human / Mouse (ortholog); Top expressed in: ventricular zone; ganglionic eminence; pancreatic epithelial cell; cartilage tissue; parotid gland; tail of epididymis; left testis; right testis; saphenous vein; gonad / Top expressed in: medial ganglionic eminence; primitive streak; abdominal wall; somite; barrel cortex; condyle; tail of embryo; fossa; superior cervical ganglion; epiblast; More reference expression data
BioGPS	n/a
Gene ontology
Molecular function	protein binding; mRNA binding; nucleic acid binding; RNA binding
Cellular component	membrane; nucleus
Biological process	positive regulation of RNA splicing; mRNA processing
Sources:Amigo / QuickGO
Orthologs
Databases	NCBI: entry; OMA: entry
Species	Human	Mouse
Entrez	92906	72692
Ensembl	ENSG00000143889	ENSMUSG00000024095
UniProt	Q8WVV9	Q921F4
RefSeq (mRNA)	NM_001142650; NM_138394	NM_144802
RefSeq (protein)	NP_001136122; NP_612403	NP_659051
Location (UCSC)	Chr 2: 38.56 – 38.6 Mb	Chr 17: 80.34 – 80.37 Mb
PubMed search
- Wikidata
View/Edit Human	View/Edit Mouse

Heterogeneous nuclear ribonucleoprotein L-like is a protein that in humans is encoded by the HNRNPLL gene.

== Function ==
HNRNPLL is a master regulator of activation-induced alternative splicing in T cells. In particular, it alters splicing of CD45 (PTPRC; MIM 151460), a tyrosine phosphatase essential for T-cell development and activation.
