= RERE =

Protein-coding gene in humans

Identifiers
- Aliases: RERE, ARG, ARP, ATN1L, DNB1, arginine-glutamic acid dipeptide repeats, NEDBEH
- External IDs: OMIM: 605226; MGI: 2683486; GeneCards: RERE
Available structures
PDB	Ortholog search: PDBe RCSB
PDB	List of PDB id codes 2YQK

Gene location (Human)
Chr.	Chromosome 1 (human)
Band	1p36.23	Start	8,352,397 bp
Band	1p36.23	End	8,848,921 bp

Gene location (Mouse)
Chr.	Chromosome 4 (mouse)
Band	4 E2|4 81.34 cM	Start	150,281,646 bp
Band	4 E2|4 81.34 cM	End	150,621,966 bp
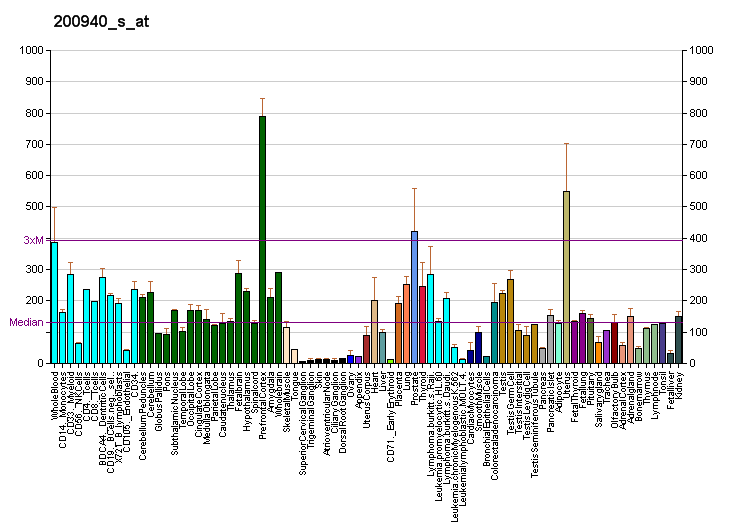

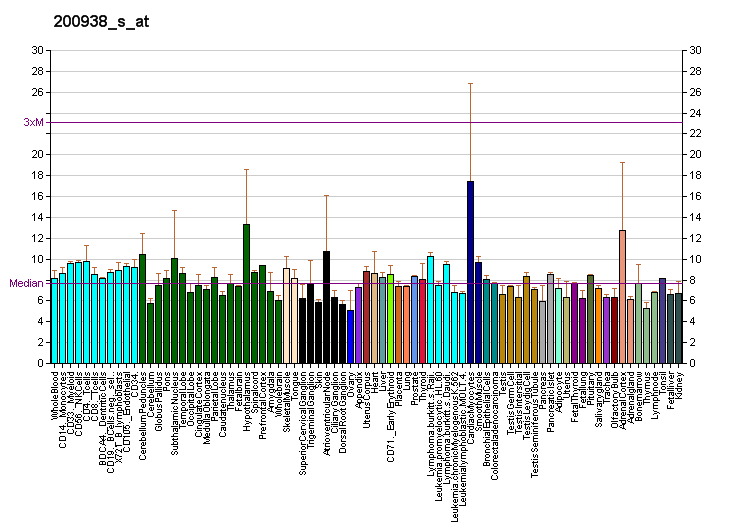

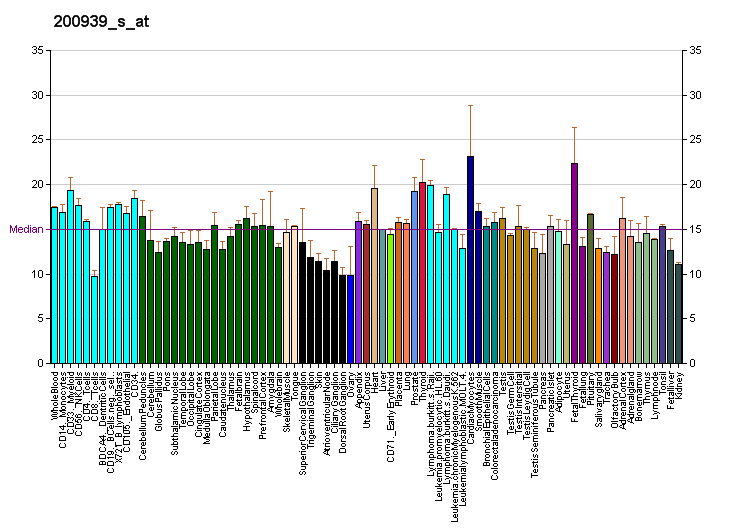
RNA expression pattern
Bgee	Human / Mouse (ortholog); Top expressed in: sural nerve; epithelium of colon; gastrocnemius muscle; body of uterus; muscle of thigh; paraflocculus of cerebellum; apex of heart; canal of the cervix; ganglionic eminence; tibialis anterior muscle / Top expressed in: vestibular membrane of cochlear duct; tail of embryo; genital tubercle; ankle joint; muscle of thigh; habenula; neural layer of retina; cerebellar cortex; superior colliculus; dorsomedial hypothalamic nucleus; More reference expression data
BioGPS	More reference expression data
Gene ontology
Molecular function	transcription coactivator activity; sequence-specific DNA binding; DNA binding; transcription corepressor activity; DNA-binding transcription factor activity; zinc ion binding; chromatin binding; metal ion binding; protein binding; poly-glutamine tract binding; DNA-binding transcription factor activity, RNA polymerase II-specific
Cellular component	histone deacetylase complex; nucleus
Biological process	chromatin remodeling; regulation of transcription, DNA-templated; dendrite morphogenesis; cerebellar Purkinje cell layer maturation; negative regulation of transcription by RNA polymerase II; transcription, DNA-templated; cerebellum development; branching morphogenesis of a nerve; cerebellar granule cell precursor proliferation; multicellular organism development; radial glia guided migration of Purkinje cell; positive regulation of transcription by RNA polymerase II; NLS-bearing protein import into nucleus; transcription by RNA polymerase II; negative regulation of nucleic acid-templated transcription; regulation of transcription by RNA polymerase II; positive regulation of nucleic acid-templated transcription
Sources:Amigo / QuickGO
Orthologs
Databases	NCBI: entry; OMA: entry
Species	Human	Mouse
Entrez	473	68703
Ensembl	ENSG00000142599	ENSMUSG00000039852
UniProt	Q9P2R6	Q80TZ9
RefSeq (mRNA)	NM_001042681; NM_001042682; NM_012102	NM_001085492
RefSeq (protein)	NP_001036146; NP_001036147; NP_036234	NP_001078961
Location (UCSC)	Chr 1: 8.35 – 8.85 Mb	Chr 4: 150.28 – 150.62 Mb
PubMed search
- Wikidata
View/Edit Human	View/Edit Mouse

Arginine-glutamic acid dipeptide repeats protein is a protein that in humans is encoded by the RERE gene.

== Function ==
This gene encodes a member of the atrophin family of arginine-glutamic acid (RE) dipeptide repeat-containing proteins. The encoded protein co-localizes with a transcription factor in the nucleus, and its overexpression triggers apoptosis. A similar protein in mouse associates with histone deacetylase and is thought to function as a transcriptional co-repressor during embryonic development. Recent reports also indicate that RERE and its Drosophila homolog associate with histone methyltransferases in regulating gene expression. Multiple transcript variants encoding different isoforms have been found for this gene.

== Interactions ==
RERE has been shown to interact with ATN1.
