= Boneless fish =

Boneless fish may refer to:

- Boneless Fish, a product of Dairei Corporation, by which a fish has been deboned and reassembled with a transglutaminase to look like a dressed fish
- Fish fillet, the flesh of a fish which has been sliced from the bone
- Fish finger, a processed food made using the meat of a whitefish which has been battered or breaded
- Fried fish, fish that has been deboned and prepared as food by frying
