= Dermal dendrocyte hamartoma =

- Specialty: Dermatology

Dermal dendrocyte hamartoma is characterized by a rounded, medallion-like lesion on the upper trunk in which there is a proliferation of fusiform CD34, factor XIIIa-positive cells in the mid and reticular dermis.

== See also ==
- Skin lesion
