= C25H37NO4 =

The molecular formula C_{25}H_{37}NO_{4} (molar mass: 415.56 g/mol, exact mass: 415.2723 u) may refer to:

- Bimatoprost
- Piericidin A
- Salmeterol
