= Davy Devaux =

Sushi chief and YouTuber

Davy Devaux is a self-taught sushi chef and YouTube personality from Denmark, currently living in Spain. He is known for creating visually unusual sushi dishes. His YouTube Channel, How To Make Sushi, showcases the recipes for these dishes. Devaux uses unorthodox ingredients such as mango puree and transglutaminase enzymes in his sushi, as well as traditional ingredients.
