= Factor XIII deficiency =

- Specialty: Hematology

Factor XIII deficiency occurs exceedingly rarely, causing a severe bleeding tendency. The incidence is one in a million to one in five million people, with higher incidence in areas with consanguineous marriage such as Iran that has the highest global incidence of the disorder. Most are due to mutations in the A subunit gene (located on chromosome 6p25-p24). This mutation is inherited in an autosomal recessive fashion.

Deficiency of Factor XIII leads to defective cross-linking of fibrin and vulnerability to late re-bleeds when the primary hemostatic plug is overwhelmed. Bleeding tendencies similar to hemophiliacs develop, such as hemarthroses and deep tissue bleeding.

As Factor XIII is composed of two subunit protein, A and B, for which the genes are located on different chromosomes, administration of recombinant A subunit improves clot stability and is becoming a therapeutic option for patients with this condition.

== Diagnosis ==
Bleeding manifestation with normal PT, aPTT, TT, BT, and CT is suspected as factor XIII Deficiency. Confirmatory test is urea lysis test. If clot is easily lysed in 5(M) urea solution then unstable clot and factor-XIII deficiency is confirmed.

== Treatment ==
=== Fresh frozen plasma and cryoprecipitate ===
Fresh frozen plasma and cryoprecipitate are the mainstay of therapy for Factor XIII deficiency, but carry risk related to transfusion.

=== Factor XIII concentrates ===
Two commercially produced factor XIII concentrates are currently available in Europe, one manufactured by Bio Products Laboratory (BPL) and only available in the United Kingdom. The other, Fibrogammin-P, is produced by Beringwerke of Germany. In the U.S. FXIII concentrate is only available under the Federal Drug Administration's Investigational New Drug (IND) Program, or through clinical trial.

=== Recombinant factor XIII ===
Recombinant factor XIII (rFXIII) is the only drug alternative to receiving blood transfusions, the traditional treatment for factor XIII deficiency. Novo's rFXIII, catridecacog, was approved by the US Food and Drug Administration in 2014. Although it is a recombinant protein, rFXIII subunit A is identical in structure and function to the A subunit of factor XIII naturally produced in the body by healthy individuals. These patients need exogenous subunit A of factor XIII since they have a mutation which prevents production of the A subunit. However, since the B-subunit is located on a separate chromosome, factor XIII deficient patients actually produce the B-subunit normally. When these two subunits interact in the plasma, the enzyme is activated and can act within the clotting cascade. rFXIII acts by inhibiting fibrinolysis factors which enzymatically cleave the fibrin matrix, leading to the ultimate formation of clots.

rFXIII is synthetically bio-engineered through a yeast expression system and administered intravenously. In clinical trials, the drug was administered once every four weeks or administered on-demand in order to treat bleeding episodes. The introduction of rFXIII as a treatment for factor XIII deficiency eliminates the risk of pathogenic infection present in plasma-based treatments. rFXIII treatment would also not be dependent on blood donations, consequently increasing availability and product quality. One of the biggest fears in developing rFXIII was that the body would mount an immune-response to the protein; however, several safety and pharmacokinetics studies have reported no immunogenic response to rFXIII or associated yeast products.

== See also ==
- Factor XIII
