= Transglutaminase =

Class of enzymes capable of forming isopeptide bonds in certain regions of proteins

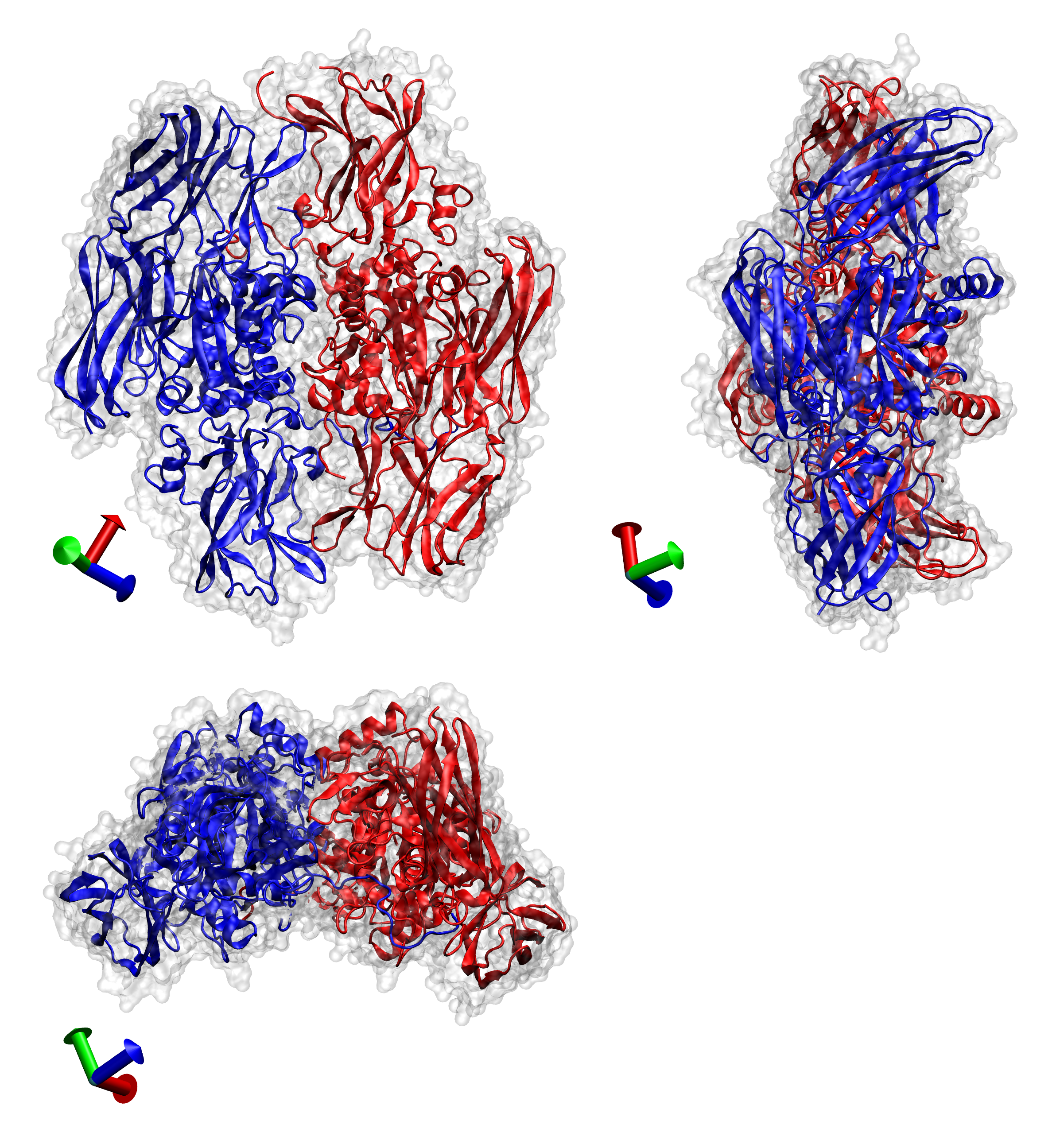
- Transglutaminase example: coagulation factor XIII from human blood. PDB code: 1EVU.

Identifiers
- EC no.: 2.3.2.13
- CAS no.: 80146-85-6

Databases
- IntEnz: IntEnz view
- BRENDA: BRENDA entry
- ExPASy: NiceZyme view
- KEGG: KEGG entry
- MetaCyc: metabolic pathway
- PRIAM: profile
- PDB structures: RCSB PDB PDBe PDBsum
Search
- PMC: articles
- PubMed: articles
- NCBI: proteins

Transglutaminases are enzymes that in nature primarily catalyze the formation of an isopeptide bond between γ-carboxamide groups ( -(C=O)NH_{2} ) of glutamine residue side chains and the ε-amino groups ( -NH_{2} ) of lysine residue side chains with subsequent release of ammonia ( NH_{3} ). Lysine and glutamine residues must be bound to a peptide or a protein so that this cross-linking (between separate molecules) or intramolecular (within the same molecule) reaction can happen. Bonds formed by transglutaminase exhibit high resistance to proteolytic degradation (proteolysis). The reaction is

Gln-(C=O)NH_{2} + NH_{2}-Lys → Gln-(C=O)NH-Lys + NH_{3}

Transglutaminases can also join a primary amine ( RNH_{2} ) to the side chain carboxyamide group of a protein/peptide bound glutamine residue thus forming an isopeptide bond

Gln-(C=O)NH_{2} + RNH_{2} → Gln-(C=O)NHR + NH_{3}

These enzymes can also deamidate glutamine residues to glutamic acid residues in the presence of water

Gln-(C=O)NH_{2} + H_{2}O → Gln-COOH + NH_{3}

Transglutaminase isolated from Streptomyces mobaraensis -bacteria for example, is a calcium-independent enzyme. Mammalian transglutaminases among other transglutaminases require Ca^{2+} ions as a cofactor.

Transglutaminases were first described in 1959. The exact biochemical activity of transglutaminases was discovered in blood coagulation protein factor XIII in 1968.

== Examples ==
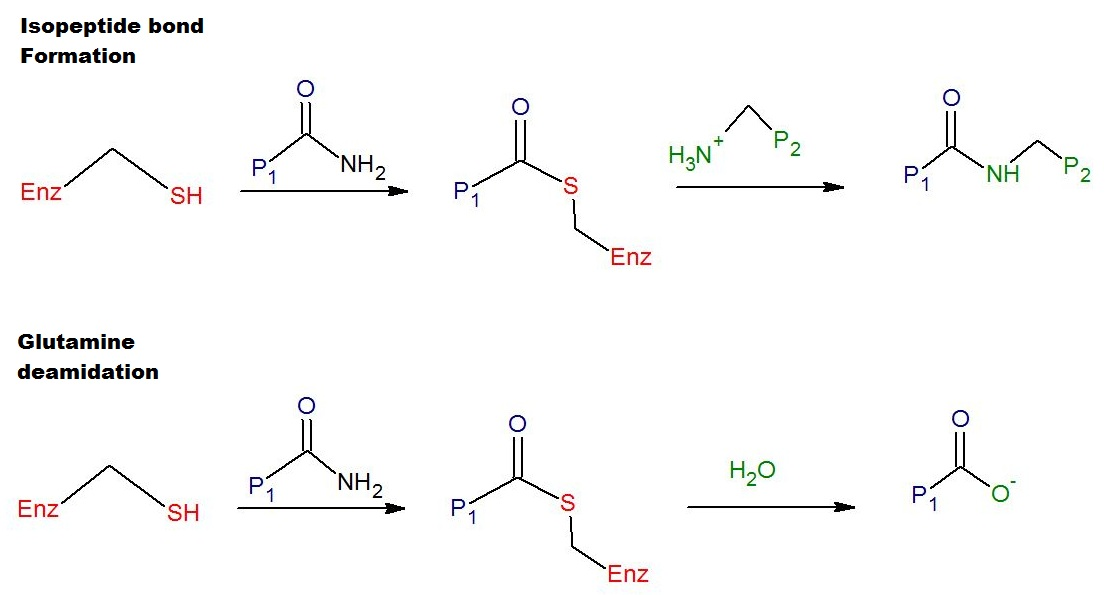
The upper reaction shows how a transaminase combines with a glutamine residue, releasing ammonia, and then the combination reacts with the amine group of a lysine residue of another protein, setting the enzyme free again.

Nine transglutaminases have been characterised in humans, eight of which catalyse transamidation reactions. These TGases have a three or four-domain organization, with immunoglobulin-like domains surrounding the central catalytic domain. The core domain belongs to the papain-like protease superfamily (CA clan) and uses a Cys-His-Asp catalytic triad. Protein 4.2, also referred to as band 4.2, is a catalytically inactive member of the human transglutaminase family that has a Cys to Ala substitution at the catalytic triad.

Name	Gene	Activity	Chromosome	OMIM
Factor XIII (fibrin-stabilizing factor) chain A	F13A1	coagulation	6p25-p24	134570
Keratinocyte transglutaminase	TGM1	skin	14q11.2	190195
Tissue transglutaminase	TGM2	ubiquitous	20q11.2-q12	190196
Epidermal transglutaminase	TGM3	skin	20q12	600238
Prostate transglutaminase	TGM4	prostate	3p22-p21.33	600585
TGM X	TGM5	skin	15q15.2	603805
TGM Y	TGM6	nerves, CNS	20q11-15	613900
TGM Z	TGM7	testis, lung	15q15.2	606776
Protein 4.2	EPB42	erythrocytes, bone marrow, spleen	15q15.2	177070

Bacterial transglutaminases are single-domain proteins with a similarly-folded core. The transglutaminase found in some bacteria runs on a Cys-Asp diad.

Transglutaminase, N-terminal, Ig E-set-like

Identifiers
- Symbol: Transglut_N
- Pfam: PF00868
- InterPro: IPR001102
- CATH: 1ex0A01
- SCOP2: d1ex0a1 / SCOPe / SUPFAM
Available protein structures:
- Pfam: structures / ECOD
- PDB: RCSB PDB; PDBe; PDBj
- PDBsum: structure summary

Transglutaminase-like, core

Identifiers
- Symbol: Transglut_core
- Pfam: PF01841
- InterPro: IPR002931
- SMART: SM00460
- PROSITE: PS00547
- CATH: 1ex0A02
- SCOP2: d1ex0a4 / SCOPe / SUPFAM
Available protein structures:
- Pfam: structures / ECOD
- PDB: RCSB PDB; PDBe; PDBj
- PDBsum: structure summary

Transglutaminase, C-terminal, Ig-like

Identifiers
- Symbol: Transglut_C
- Pfam: PF00927
- InterPro: IPR008958
- CATH: 1ex0A03
- SCOP2: d1ex0a2 / SCOPe / SUPFAM
Available protein structures:
- Pfam: structures / ECOD
- PDB: RCSB PDB; PDBe; PDBj
- PDBsum: structure summary

Transglutaminase, bacterial

Identifiers
- Symbol: Transglut_prok
- Pfam: PF09017
- InterPro: IPR015107
- CATH: 3iu0
- SCOP2: 1iu4 / SCOPe / SUPFAM
Available protein structures:
- Pfam: structures / ECOD
- PDB: RCSB PDB; PDBe; PDBj
- PDBsum: structure summary

== Biological role ==
Transglutaminases form extensively cross-linked, generally insoluble protein polymers. These biological polymers are indispensable for an organism to create barriers and stable structures. Examples are blood clots (coagulation factor XIII), skin, and hair. The catalytic reaction is generally viewed as being irreversible, and must be closely monitored through extensive control mechanisms.

== Role in disease ==
Deficiency of factor XIII (a rare genetic condition) predisposes to hemorrhage; concentrated enzyme can be used to correct the abnormality and reduce bleeding risk.

Anti-transglutaminase antibodies are found in celiac disease and may play a role in the small bowel damage in response to dietary gliadin that characterises this condition. In the related condition dermatitis herpetiformis, in which small bowel changes are often found and which responds to dietary exclusion of gliadin-containing wheat products, epidermal transglutaminase is the predominant autoantigen.

Recent research indicates that sufferers from neurological diseases like Huntington's and Parkinson's may have unusually high levels of one type of transglutaminase, tissue transglutaminase. It is hypothesized that tissue transglutaminase may be involved in the formation of the protein aggregates that causes Huntington's disease, although it is most likely not required.

Mutations in keratinocyte transglutaminase are implicated in lamellar ichthyosis.

== Structural studies ==
As of late 2007, 19 structures have been solved for this class of enzymes, with PDB accession codes 1EVU, 1EX0, 1F13, 1FIE, 1G0D, 1GGT, 1GGU, 1GGY, 1IU4, 1KV3, 1L9M, 1L9N, 1NUD, 1NUF, 1NUG, 1QRK, 1RLE, 1SGX, and 1VJJ.

== Industrial and culinary applications ==
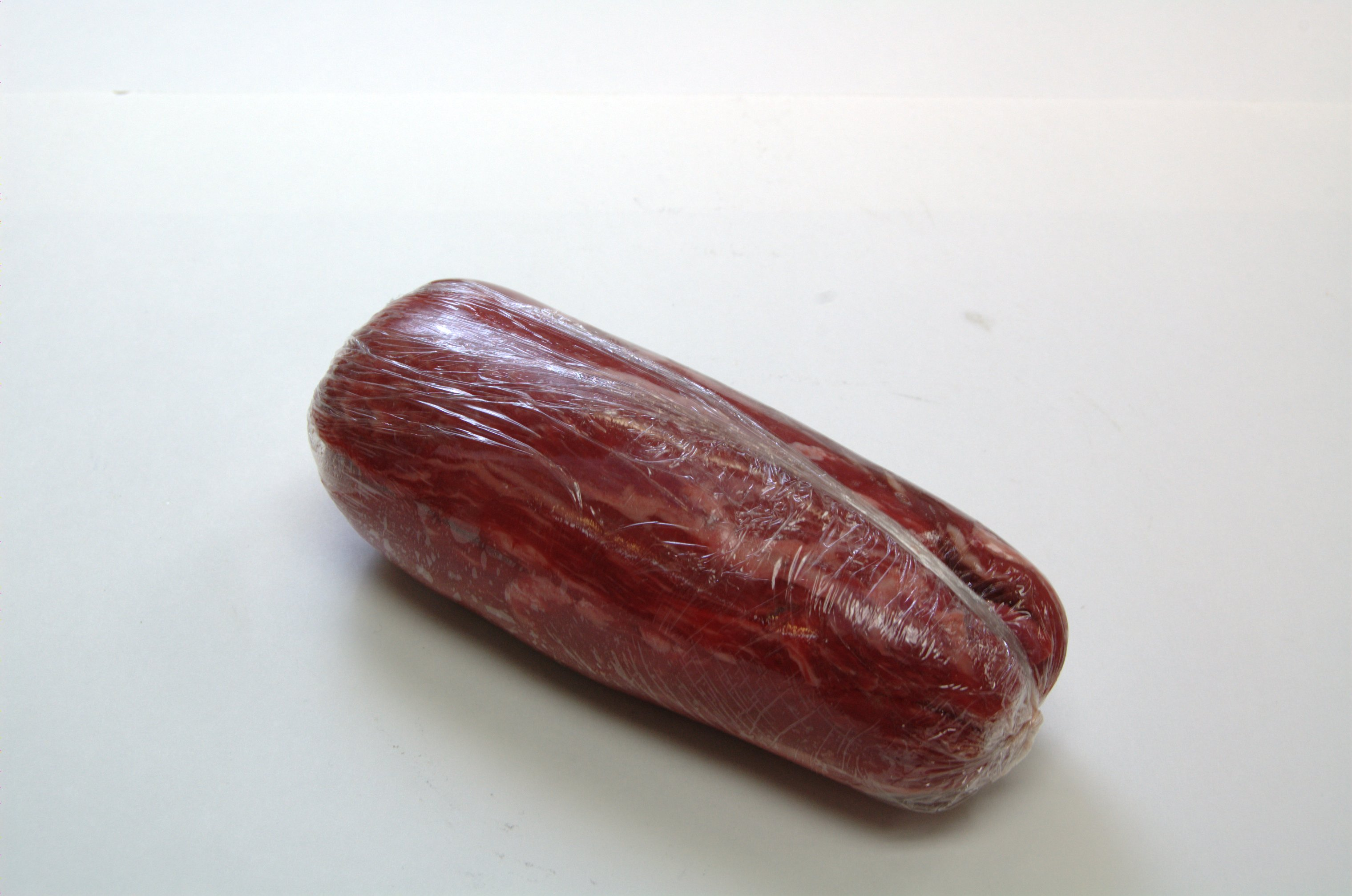
Three bistro tenders being joined together with transglutaminase "meat glue". They will set overnight before being unwrapped, sliced into portions, cooked, and served.

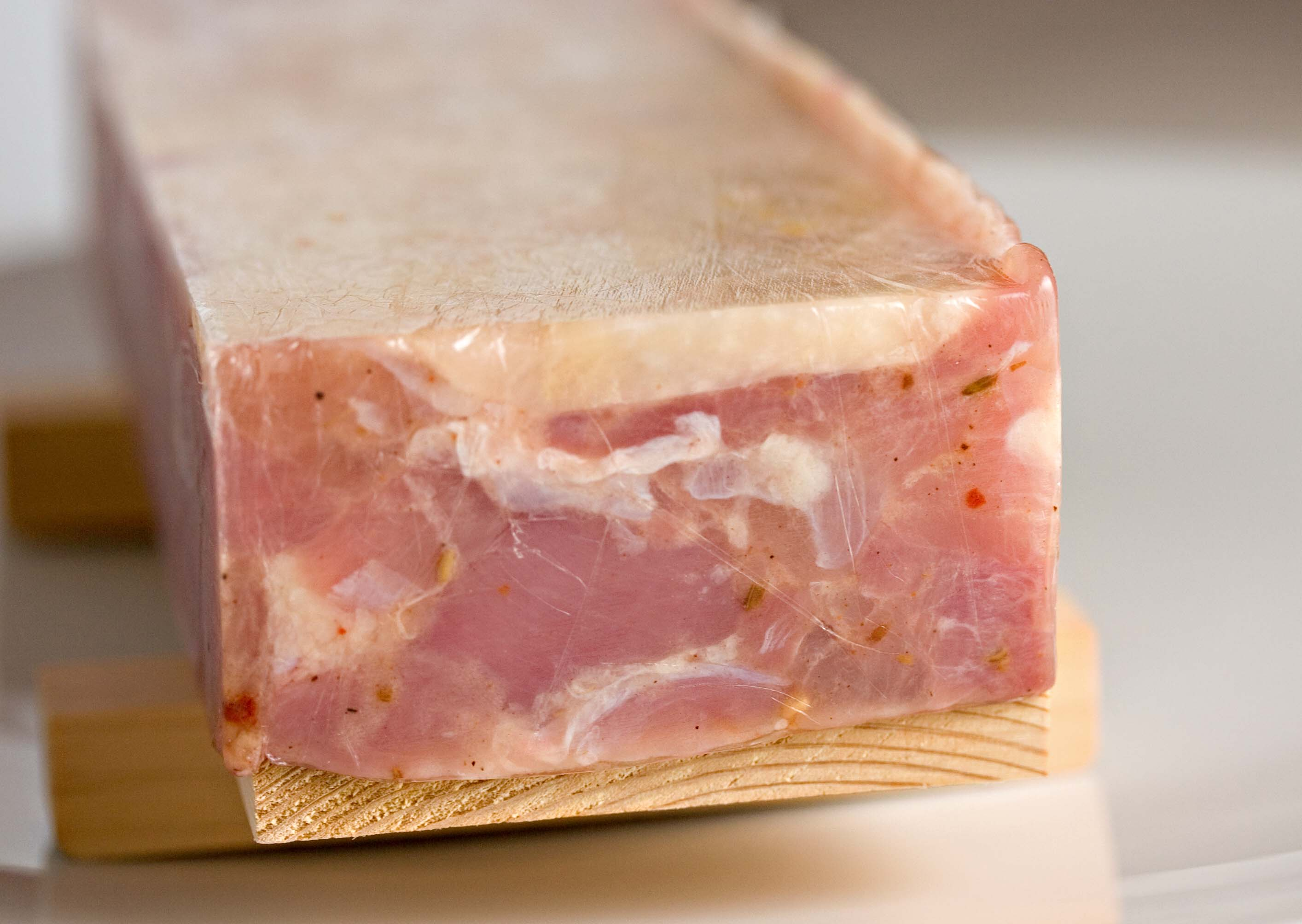
Transglutaminase treated chicken terrine.

In commercial food processing, transglutaminase is used to bond proteins together. Examples of foods made using transglutaminase include imitation crabmeat, and fish balls. It is produced by Streptomyces mobaraensis fermentation in commercial quantities (P81453) or extracted from animal blood, and is used in a variety of processes, including the production of processed meat and fish products.

Transglutaminase can be used as a binding agent to improve the texture of protein-rich foods such as surimi or ham.

Thrombin–fibrinogen "meat glue" from bovine and porcine sources was banned throughout the European Union as a food additive in 2010. Transglutaminase remains allowed and is not required to be declared, as it is considered a processing aid and not an additive which remains present in the final product.

=== Molecular gastronomy ===
Transglutaminase is also used in molecular gastronomy to meld new textures with existing tastes. Besides these mainstream uses, transglutaminase has been used to create some unusual foods. British chef Heston Blumenthal is credited with the introduction of transglutaminase into modern cooking.

Wylie Dufresne, chef of New York's avant-garde restaurant wd~50, was introduced to transglutaminase by Blumenthal, and invented a "pasta" made from over 95% shrimp thanks to transglutaminase.

== Synonyms ==
- protein-glutamine gamma-glutamyltransferase (systematic)
- fibrinoligase
- glutaminylpeptide gamma-glutamyltransferase
- protein-glutamine:amine gamma-glutamyltransferase
- R-glutaminyl-peptide:amine gamma-glutamyl transferase

== See also ==
- Boneless Fish
- Bromelain
- Ficain
- Papain
- Surimi
