= Coagulation factor XIII B chain =

Mammalian protein found in humans

F13B

Identifiers
- Aliases: F13B, FXIIIB, coagulation factor XIII B chain
- External IDs: OMIM: 134580; MGI: 88379; GeneCards: F13B

Gene location (Human)
Chr.	Chromosome 1 (human)
Band	1q31.3	Start	197,038,741 bp
Band	1q31.3	End	197,067,260 bp

Gene location (Mouse)
Chr.	Chromosome 1 (mouse)
Band	1 F|1 61.57 cM	Start	139,429,440 bp
Band	1 F|1 61.57 cM	End	139,451,490 bp
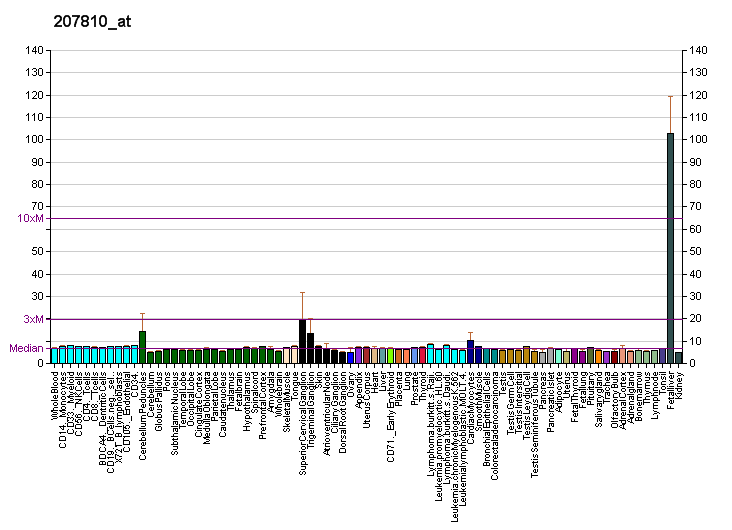
RNA expression pattern
Bgee	Human / Mouse (ortholog); Top expressed in: right lobe of liver; testicle; jejunal mucosa; duodenum; gonad; gallbladder; skin of thigh; Ventricular system of neuraxis; ventricular zone; cell / Top expressed in: left lobe of liver; right kidney; human kidney; proximal tubule; morula; sexually immature organism; gallbladder; human fetus; secondary oocyte; right lobe of liver; More reference expression data
BioGPS	More reference expression data
Orthologs
Databases	NCBI: entry; OMA: entry
Species	Human	Mouse
Entrez	2165	14060
Ensembl	ENSG00000143278	ENSMUSG00000026368
UniProt	P05160	Q07968
RefSeq (mRNA)	NM_001994	NM_031164
RefSeq (protein)	NP_001985	NP_112441
Location (UCSC)	Chr 1: 197.04 – 197.07 Mb	Chr 1: 139.43 – 139.45 Mb
PubMed search
- Wikidata
View/Edit Human	View/Edit Mouse

Coagulation factor XIII B chain is a protein that in humans is encoded by the F13B gene.

This gene encodes coagulation factor XIII B subunit. Coagulation factor XIII is the last zymogen to become activated in the blood coagulation cascade. Plasma factor XIII is a heterotetramer composed of 2 A subunits and 2 B subunits. The A subunits have catalytic function, and the B subunits do not have enzymatic activity and may serve as a plasma carrier molecules. Platelet factor XIII is composed of just 2 A subunits, which are identical to those of plasma origin. Upon activation by the cleavage of the activation peptide by thrombin and in the presence of calcium ion, the plasma factor XIII dissociates its B subunits and yields the same active enzyme, factor XIIIa, as platelet factor XIII. This enzyme acts as a transglutaminase to catalyze the formation of gamma-glutamyl-epsilon-lysine crosslinking between fibrin molecules, thus stabilizing the fibrin clot. Factor XIII deficiency is classified into two categories: type I deficiency, characterized by the lack of both the A and B subunits; and type II deficiency, characterized by the lack of the A subunit alone. These defects can result in a lifelong bleeding tendency, defective wound healing, and habitual abortion.

== Interactions ==
F13B has been shown to interact with Coagulation factor XIII A chain.
