= Catridecacog =

Genetically engineered medicine

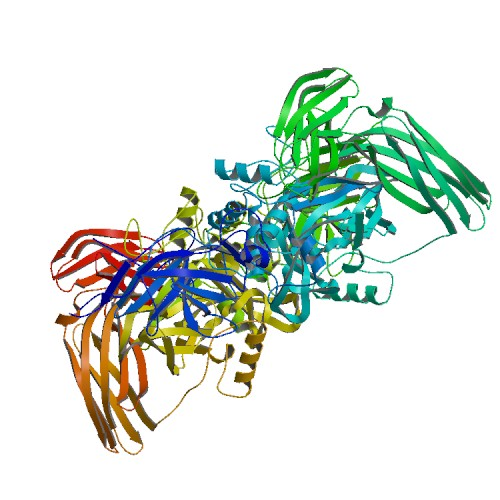

Clinical data
- Trade names: Tretten, NovoThirteen
- AHFS/Drugs.com: Monograph
- License data: EU EMA: by INN; US DailyMed: Catridecacog
- Pregnancy category: AU: B2
- Routes of administration: Injection
- ATC code: B02BD11 (WHO)

Legal status
- Legal status: AU: Unscheduled; US: ℞-only; EU: Rx-only

Identifiers
- CAS Number: 606138-08-3
- DrugBank: DB09310
- ChemSpider: none
- UNII: NU23Q531G1
- KEGG: D10532
- ChEMBL: ChEMBL2108282

Catridecacog, sold under the brand name Tretten in the US and NovoThirteen in the EU, is a class of recombinant factor XIII A-subunit based biopharmaceutical medicine, indicated in patients with a rare clotting disorder, congenital factor XIII A-subunit deficiency, which is a kind of Factor XIII deficiency. The medication prevents bleeding in patients with this condition, and has been approved by the U.S. Food and Drug Administration (FDA) for this use in the US in 2014. It was brought to market by Novo.
