= Kalman Laki =

Hungarian-American biochemist

Kálmán Laki
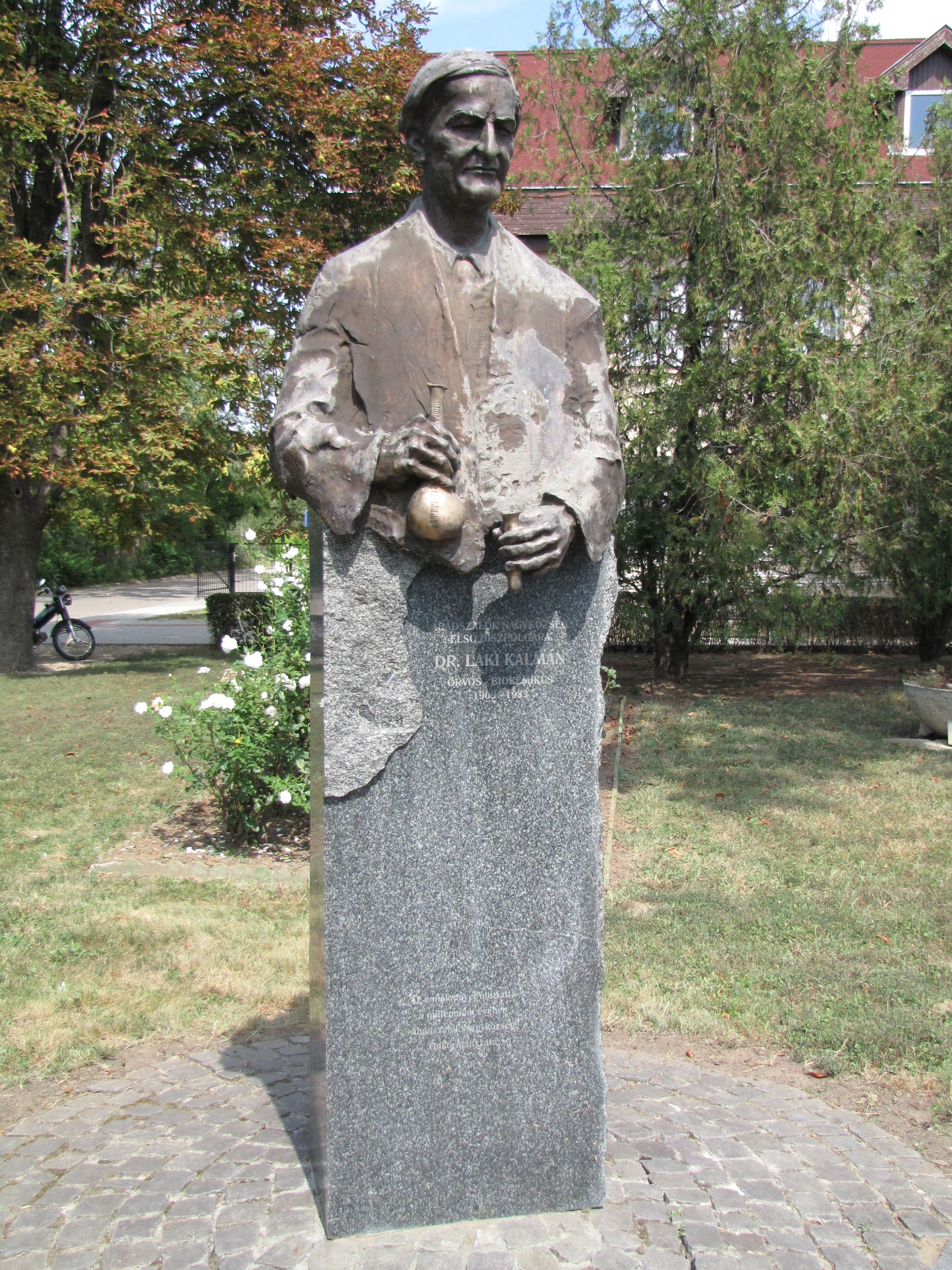
- Statue in Abádszalók, Hungary
- Born: February 1, 1909; Szolnok, Hungary
- Died: February 12, 1983 (aged 74); Fairfax, Virginia, US
- Education: University of Szeged
- Awards: Kossuth Prize
- Scientific career
- Fields: Biochemistry
- Workplaces: National Institutes of Health

Kalman Laki (February 1, 1909 – February 12, 1983), sometimes referred to as Koloman Laki, was a Hungarian-American biochemist who contributed to the discovery of factor XIII. He was a scientist at the US National Institutes of Health (NIH).

== Biography ==
Born in Szolnok, Hungary, Laki completed doctoral studies in chemistry at the University of Szeged before coming to the United States in 1947 as an NIH scientist. He was the chief of the biophysical chemistry laboratory at the National Institute of Arthritis, Diabetes, Digestive and Kidney Diseases. In 1970, he became the head of a physical biochemistry laboratory at the institute.

Laki and biochemist Laszlo Lorand (whom Laki had recruited to Albert Szent-Györgyi's laboratory when Lorand was a medical student) worked on biochemical research in coagulation. A substance they identified, initially named Laki–Lorand factor, became known as factor XIII. Laki was awarded an honorary medical degree from the University of Debrecen.

Laki died at Fairfax Hospital in 1983. He had been in the hospital after minor surgery when he had a heart attack.
