= Fish fillet =

Elongated cut of fish

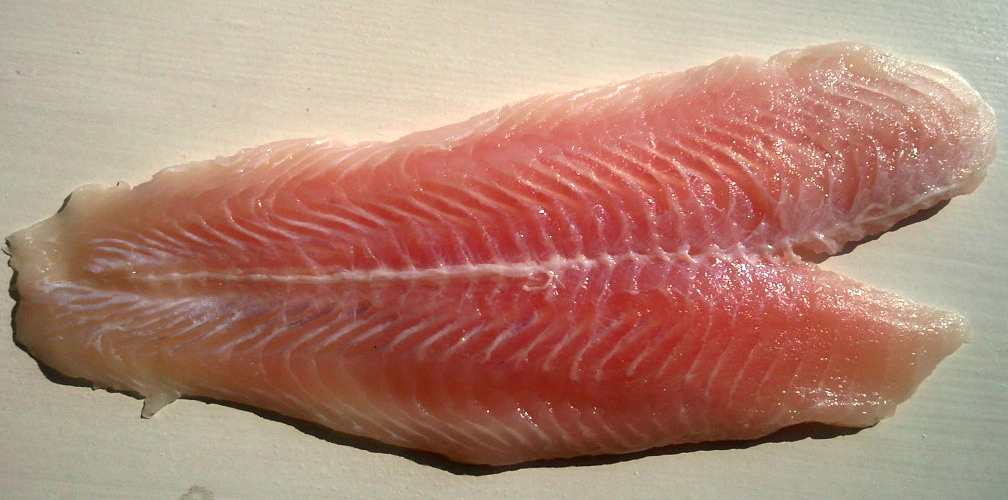
Fillet of iridescent shark

A fish fillet, from the French word filet (pronounced [filɛ]) meaning a thread or strip, is the flesh of a fish which has been cut or sliced away from the bone by cutting lengthwise along one side of the fish parallel to the backbone. In preparation for filleting, any scales on the fish should be removed. The contents of the stomach also need careful detaching from the fillet. Because fish fillets do not contain the larger bones running along the vertebrae, they are often said to be "boneless". However, some species, such as the common carp, have smaller intramuscular bones called pins within the fillet. The skin present on one side may or may not be stripped from the fillet. Butterfly fillets can be produced by cutting the fillets on each side in such a way that they are held together by the flesh and skin of the belly.

Fish fillets can be contrasted with fish steaks (also known as fish cutlets), which are cut perpendicular to the spine and include the larger bones.

== Filleting ==
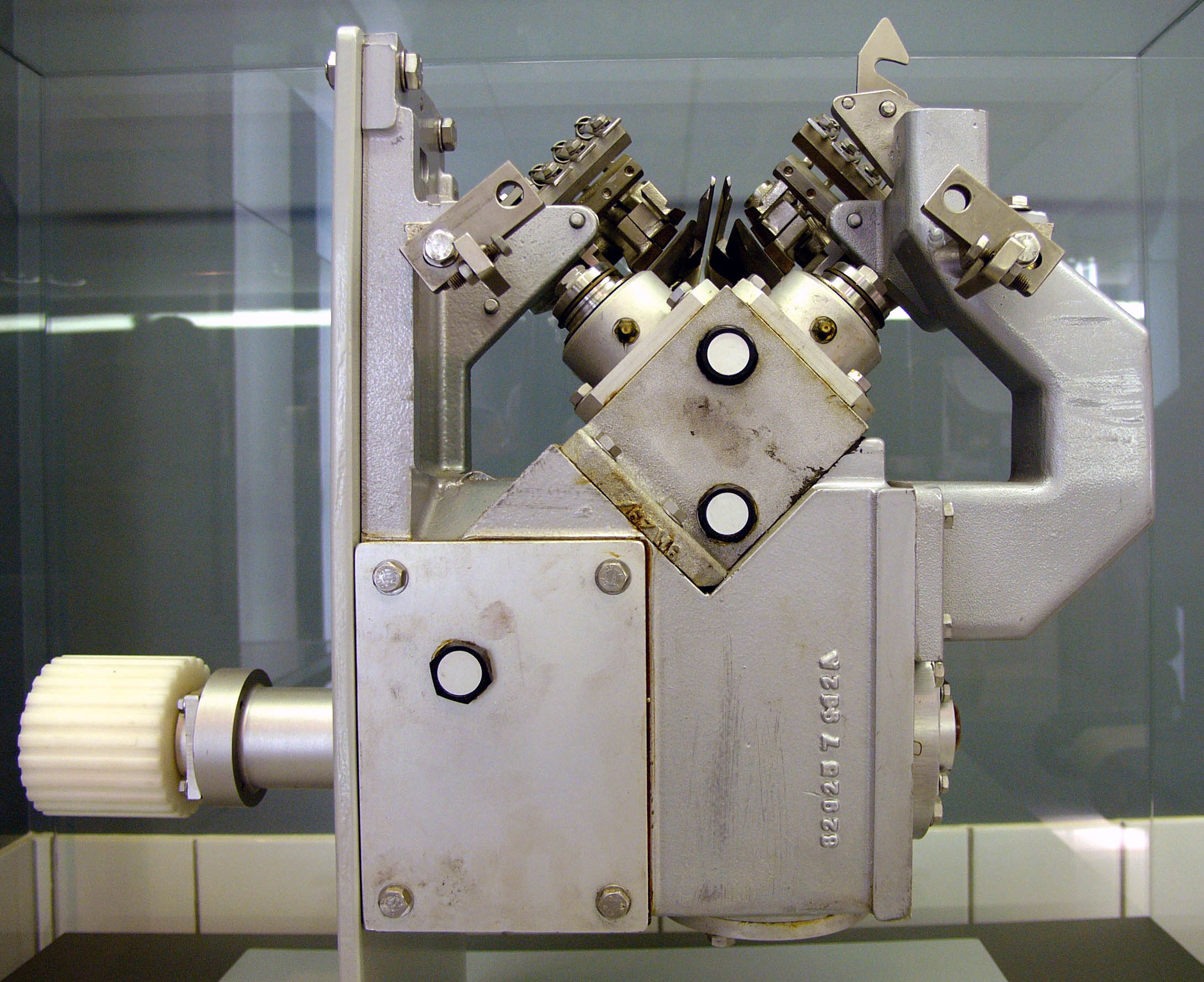
Automatic knives for filleting fish

Fish fillets comprise the flesh of the fish, which is the skeletal muscles and fat as opposed to the bones and organs. Fillets are usually obtained by slicing the fish parallel to the spine, rather than perpendicular to the spine as is the case with steaks. The remaining bones with the attached flesh is called the "frame", and is often used to make fish stock. As opposed to whole fish or fish steaks, fillets do not contain the fish's backbone; they yield less flesh, but are easier to eat.

Special cut fillets are taken from solid large blocks; these include a "natural" cut fillet, wedge, rhombus or tail shape. Fillets may be skinless or have skin on; pinbones may or may not be removed. A fletch is a large boneless fillet of halibut, swordfish or tuna.

There are several ways to cut a fish fillet:

- Cutlet: obtained by slicing from behind the head of the fish, round the belly and tapering towards the tail. The fish is then turned and the process repeated on the other side to produce a double fillet
- Single: more complex than the cutlet, produces two separate fillets, one from each side of the fish.
- "J" Cut: produced in the same way as a single fillet but the pin bones are removed by cutting a "J" shape from the fillet
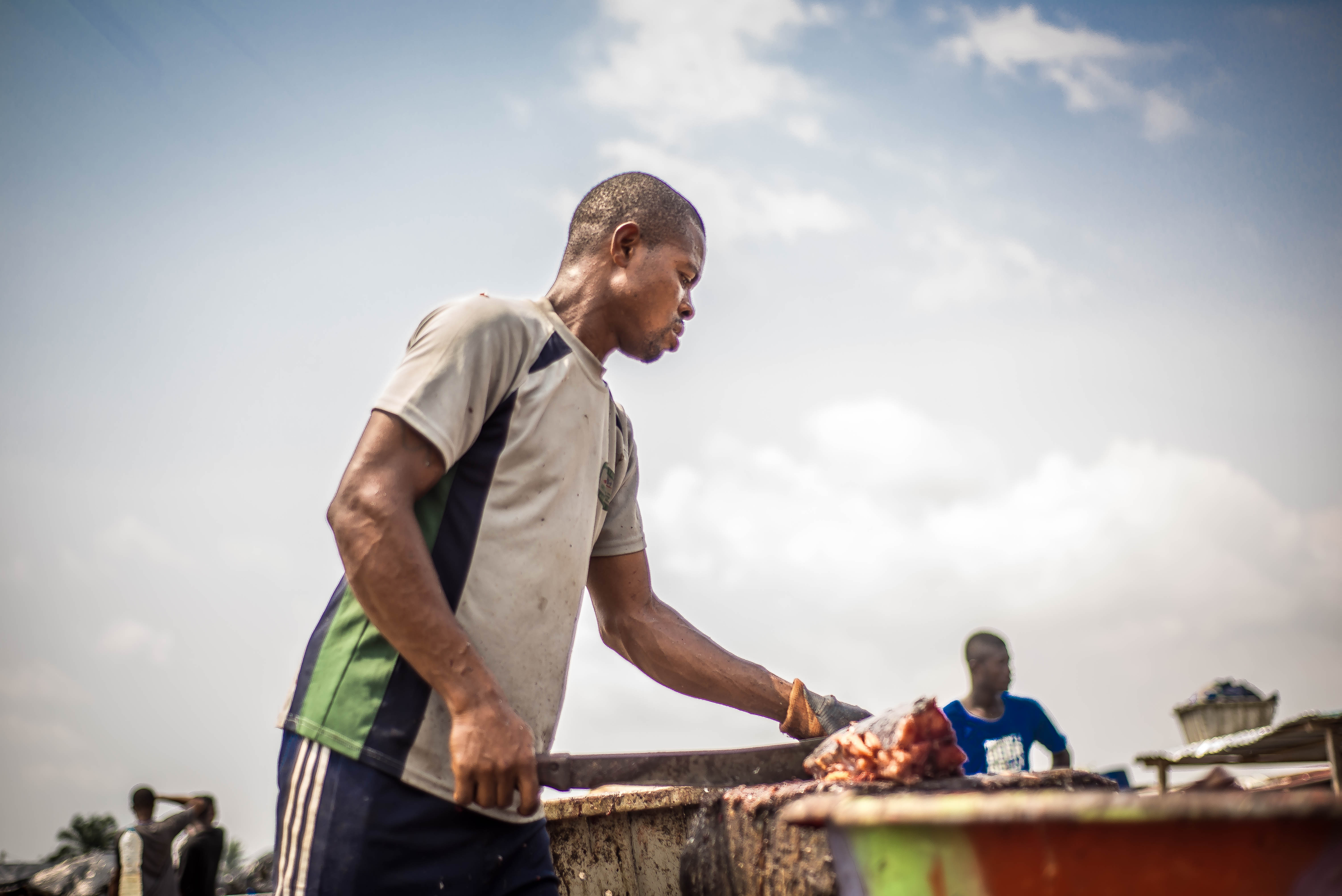
Filleting fish in the Ivory Coast

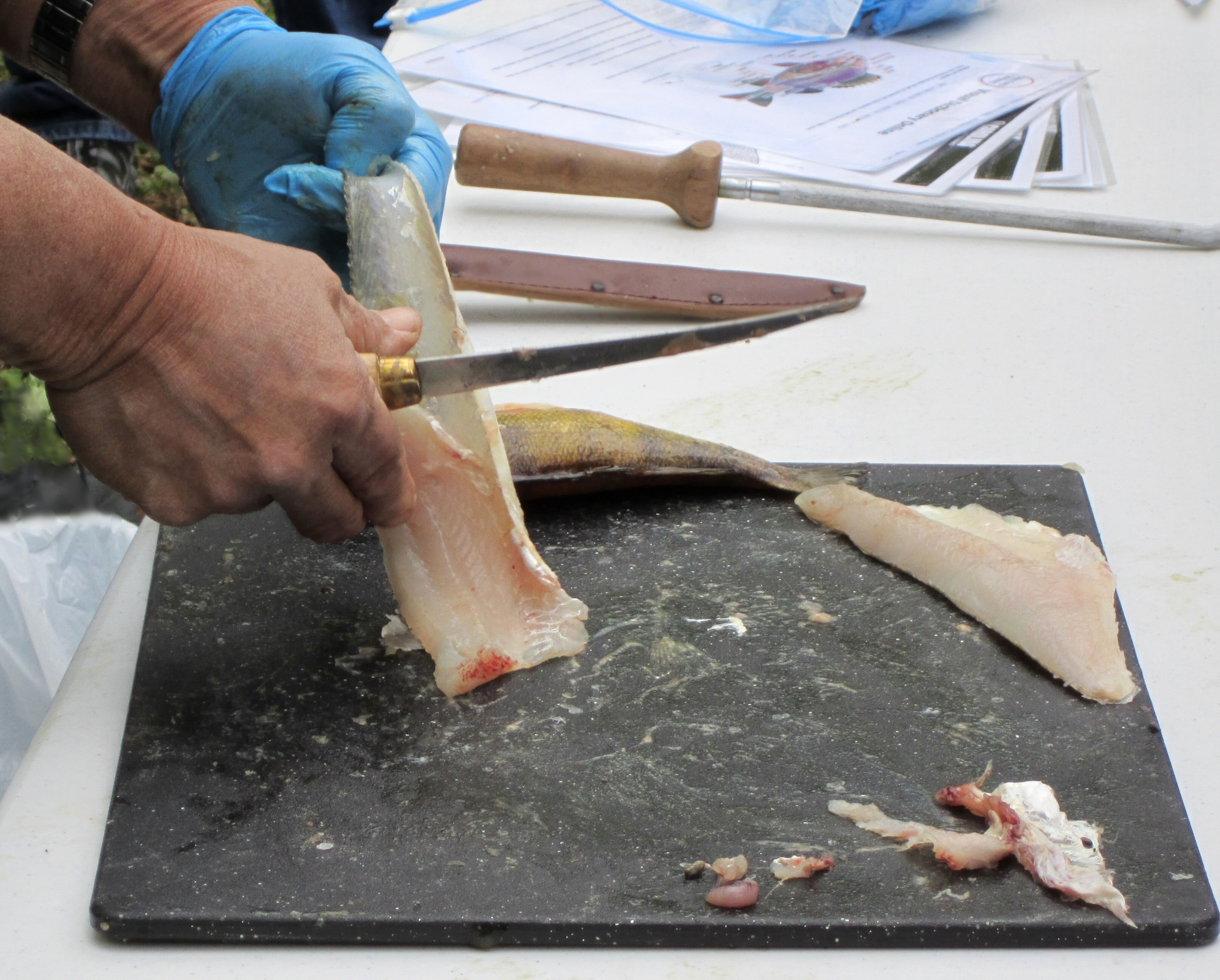
Filleting a fish, demonstration

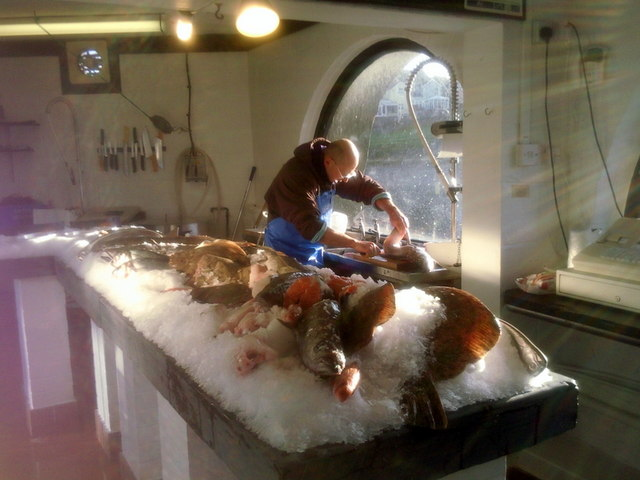
Fishmonger filleting a pollock

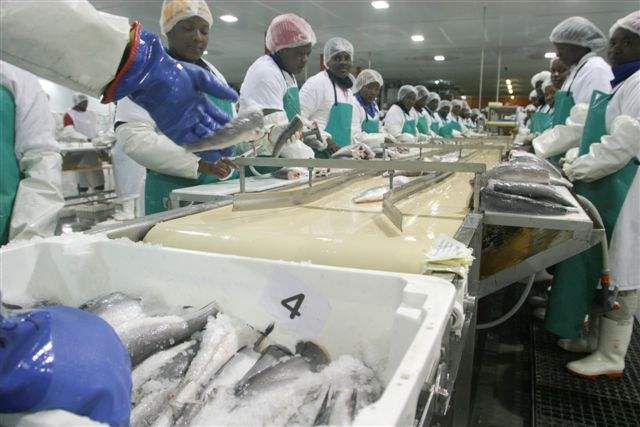
Filleting hake on a production line

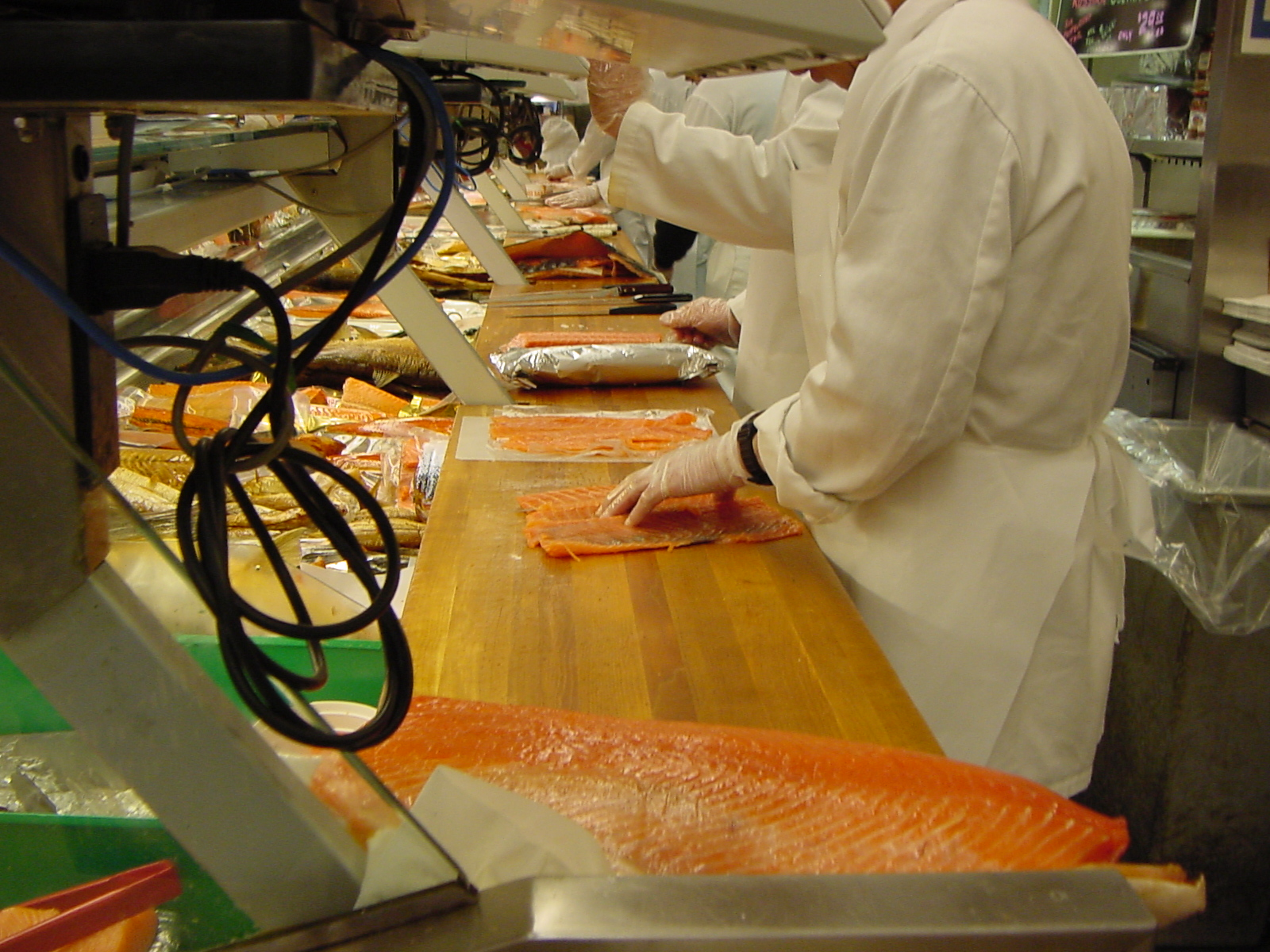
Another filleting production line

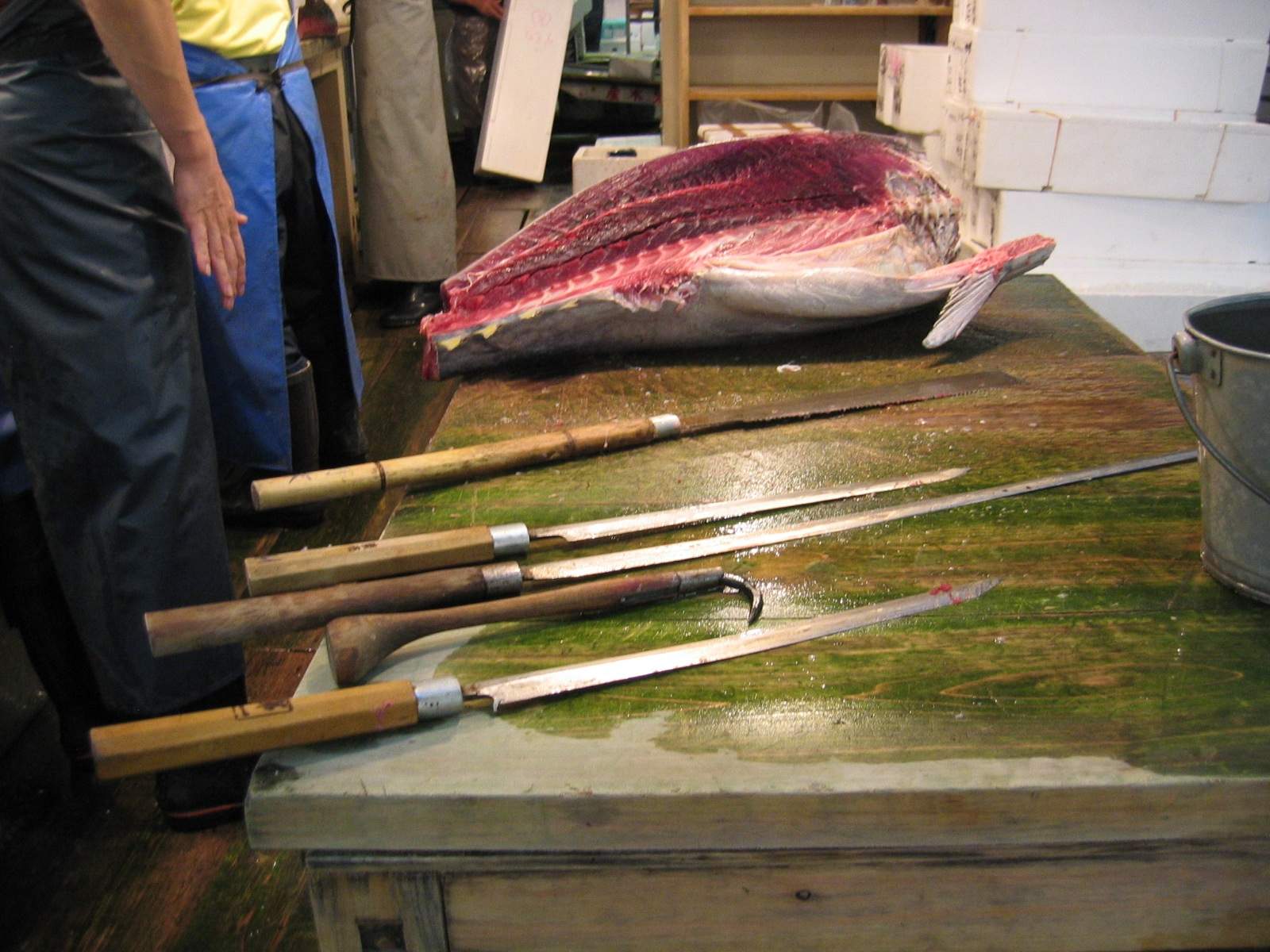
Knives used to fillet tuna at the Tsukiji fish market

== Marketing ==
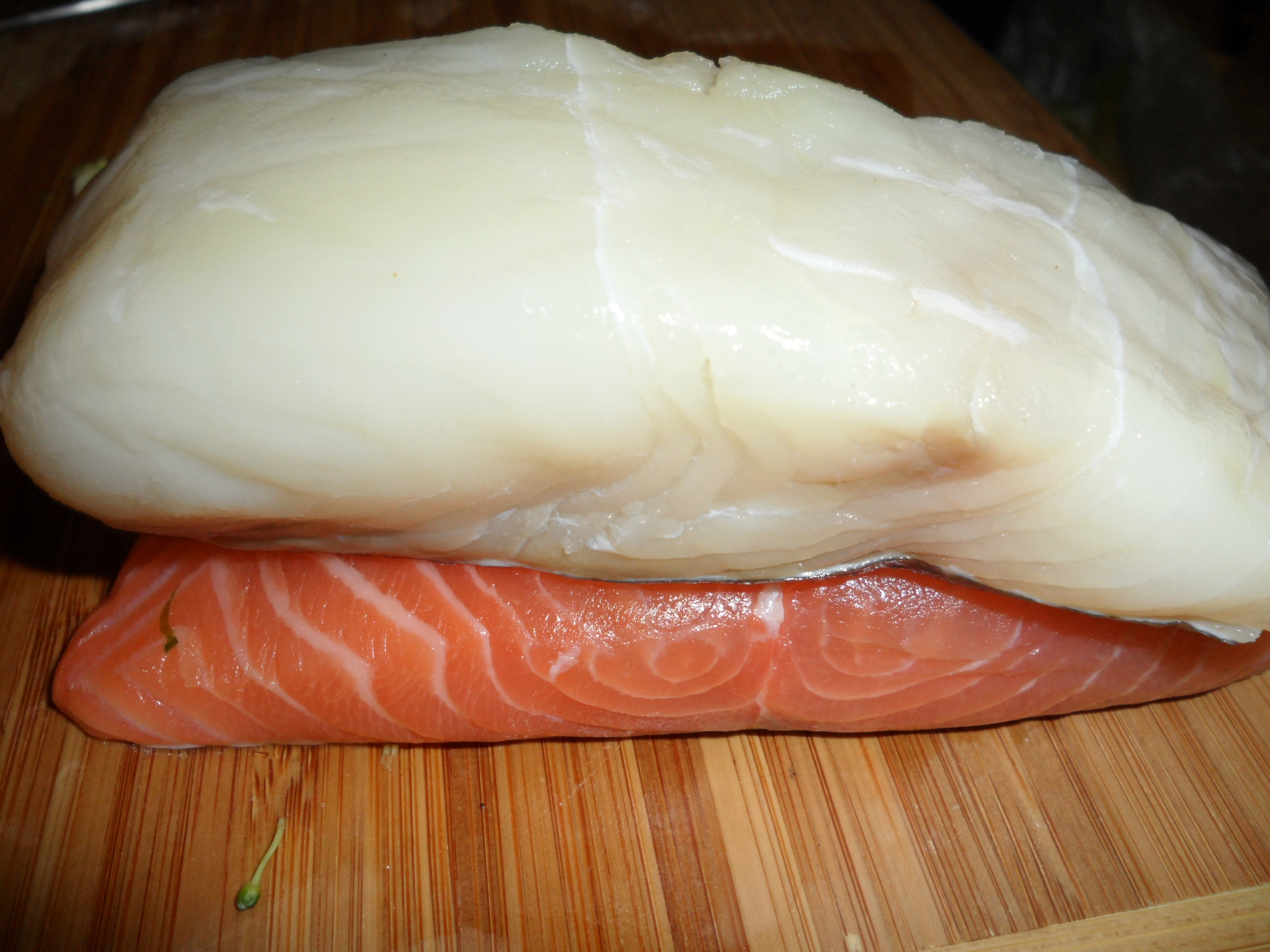
Halibut fillet (a whitefish) on top of a salmon fillet (a pelagic fish)

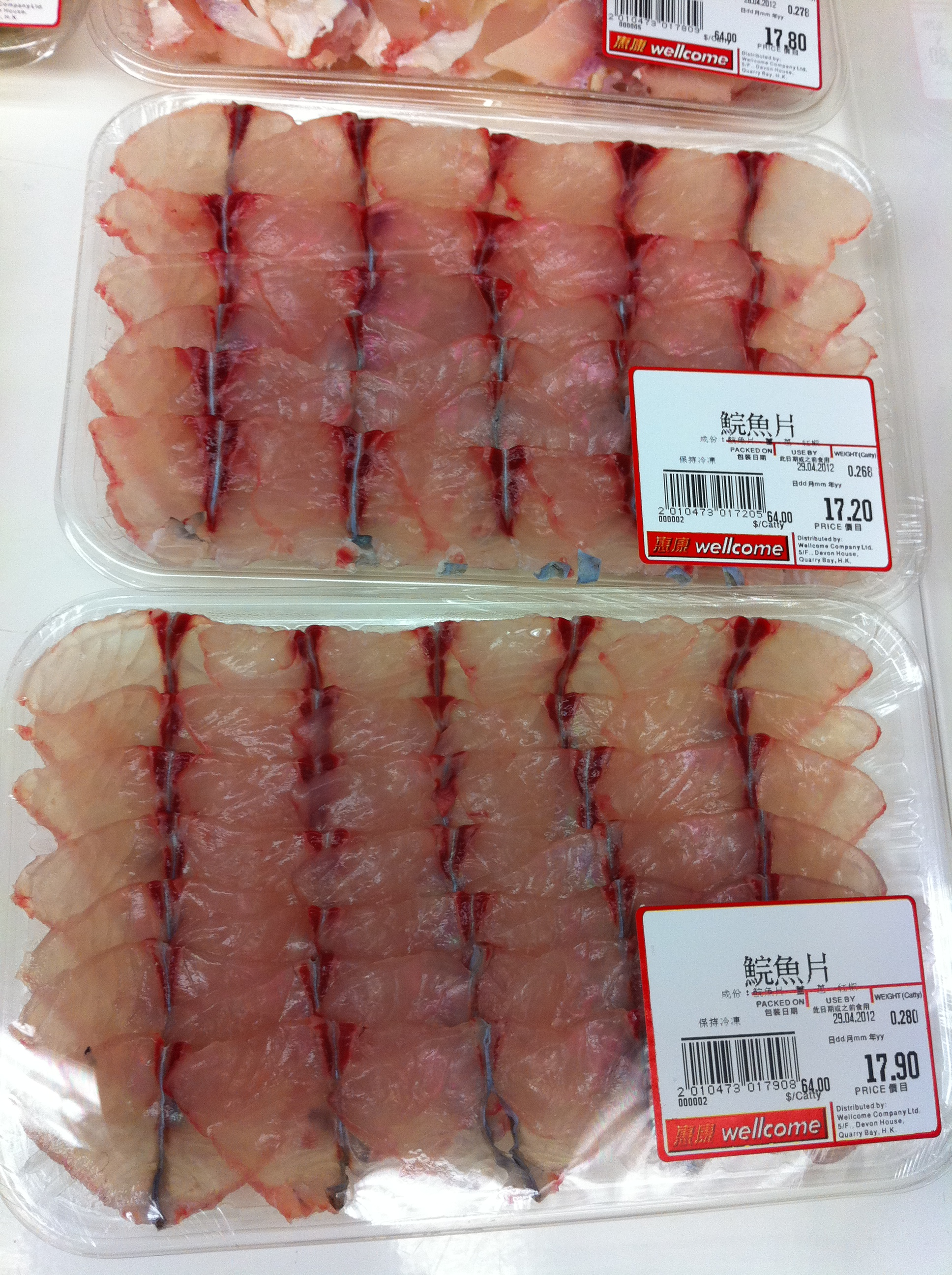
Packed and iced fillets of grass carp

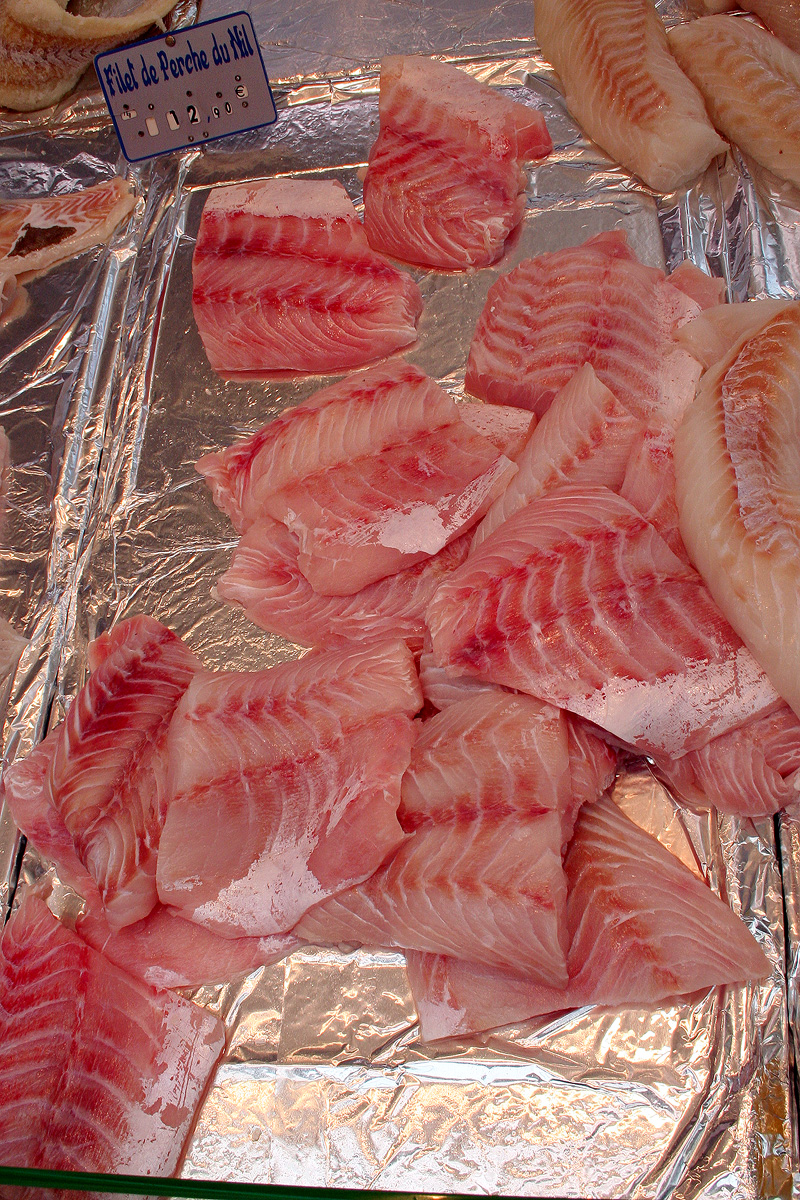
Filleted Nile perch at a fishmarket

== Eating ==
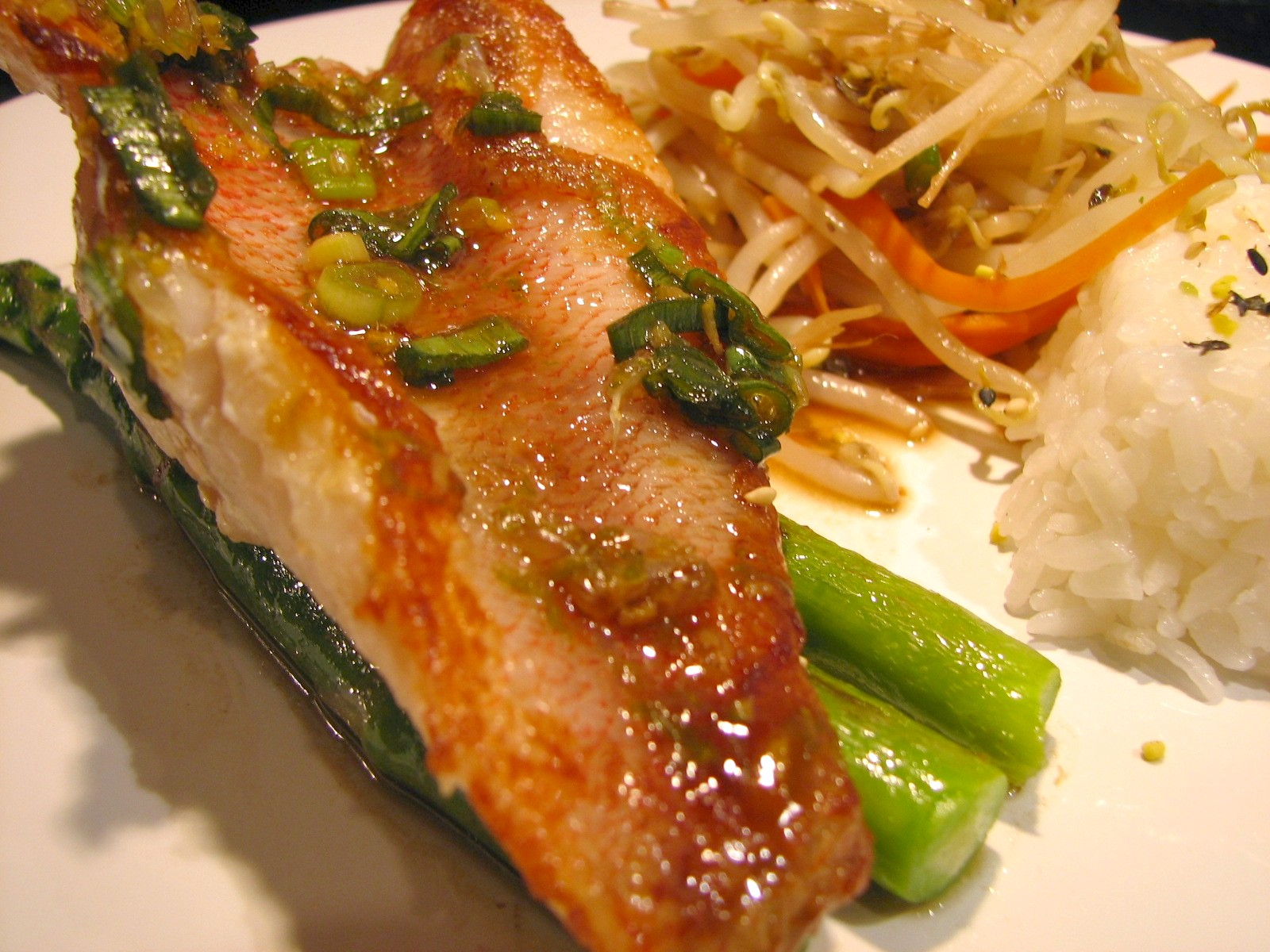
Pan-fried red snapper fillet

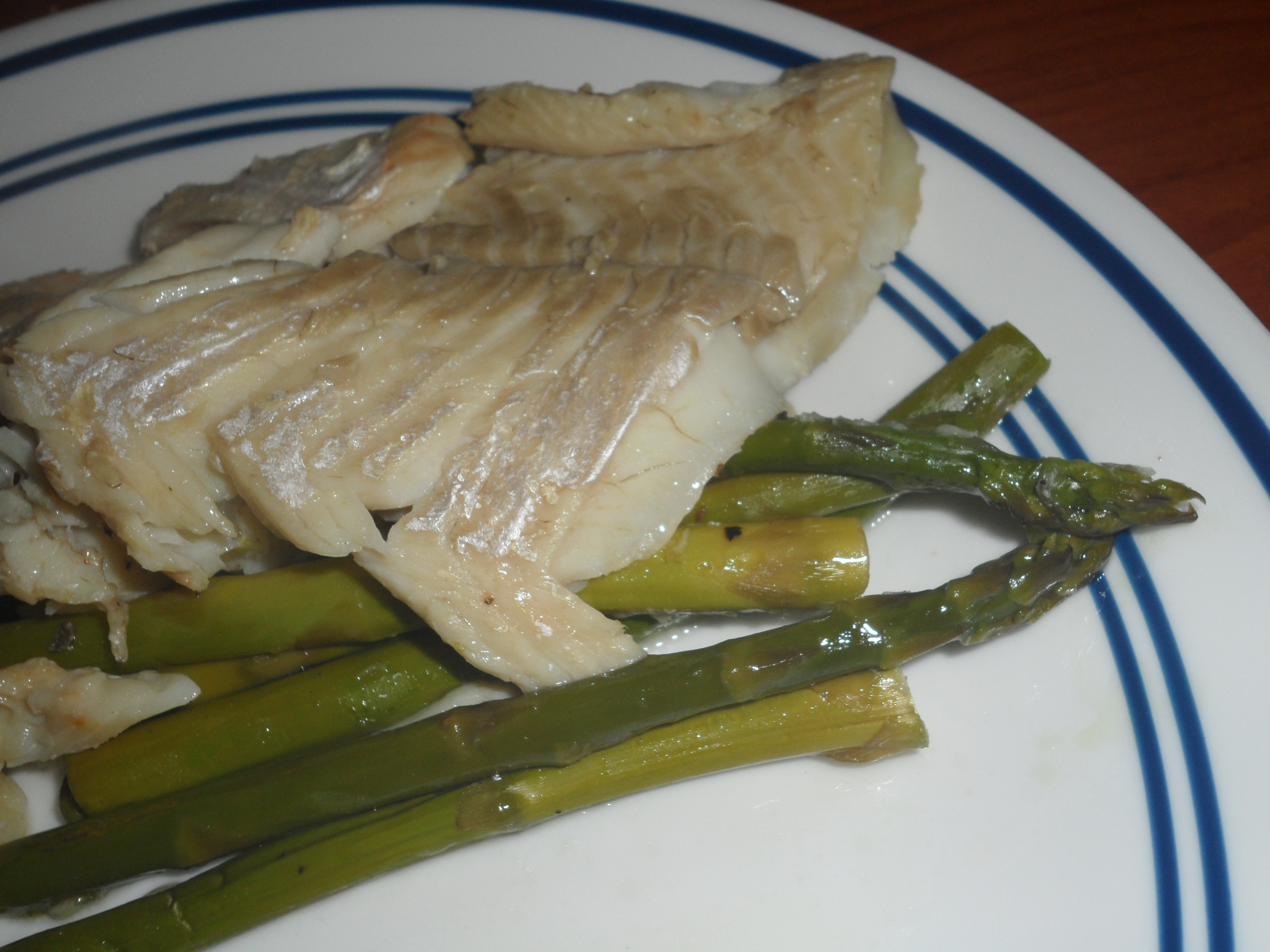
Baked fillet with asparagus

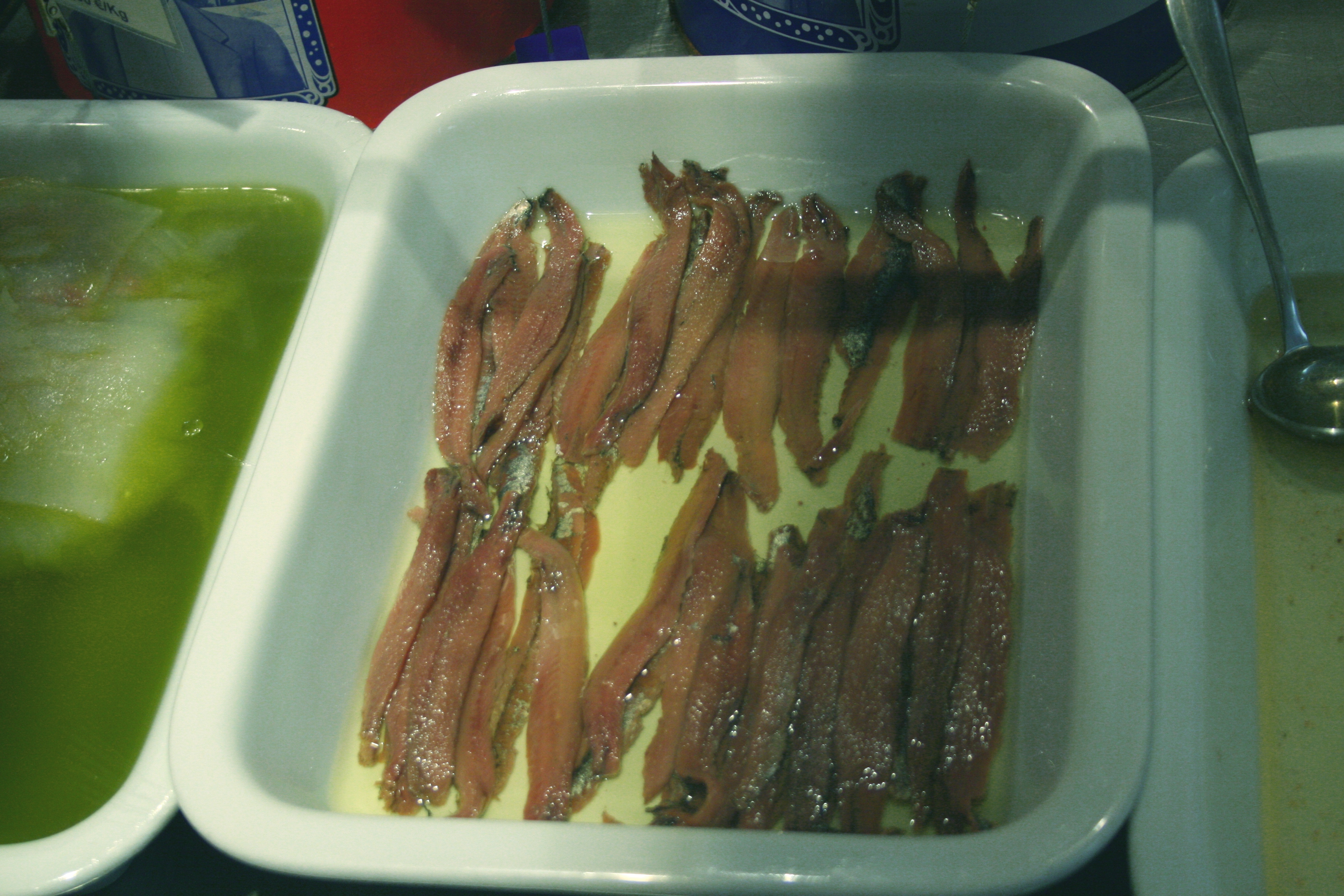
Anchovies filleted in oil

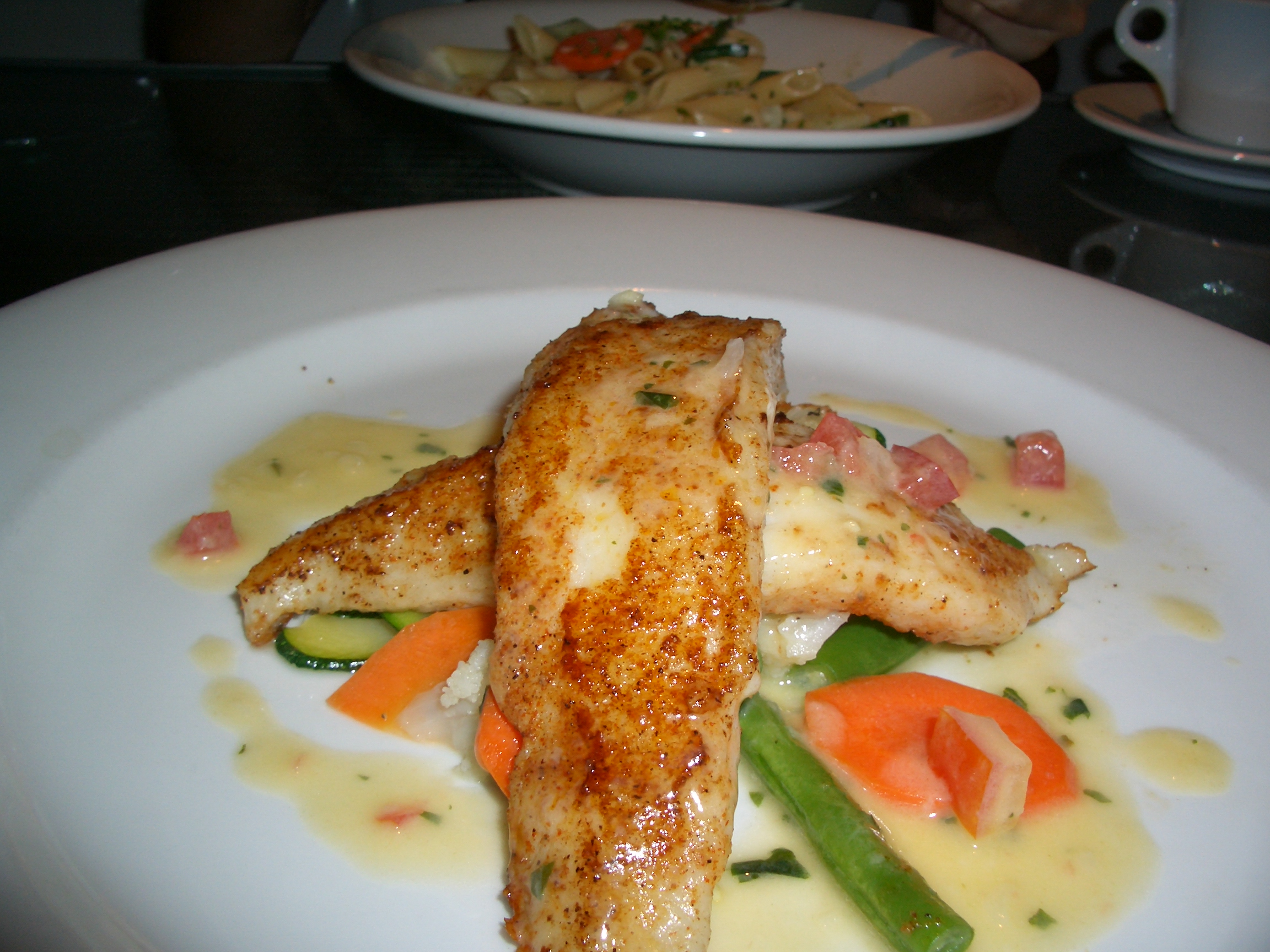
Fillet of John Dory

== See also ==
- Boneless Fish
- Fish fillet processor
