= Laszlo Lorand =

Hungarian-American biochemist (1923–2018)

László Lóránd
- Born: 23 March 1923; Győr, Hungary
- Died: 6 December 2018 (aged 95)
- Education: University of Leeds
- Scientific career
- Fields: Biochemistry
- Workplaces: Feinberg School of Medicine

Laszlo Lorand (23 March 1923 – 6 December 2018) was a Hungarian-American biochemist who studied clotting of blood and other bodily fluids. A professor emeritus in cell and molecular biology at the Feinberg School of Medicine, Lorand was a longtime professor in the departments of chemistry and molecular biosciences at Northwestern University before transferring to Northwestern's medical school. Lorand was a co-discoverer of the substance that later became known as factor XIII. He was a member of the National Academy of Sciences.

== Biography ==
Lorand was born in Győr, Hungary. His father was murdered in Auschwitz, but he himself managed to avoid being sent there. Lorand was a Holocaust survivor and Jewish. He submitted a record of his experiences in the Holocaust to the Yad Vaashem witness data base programme in Israel.

He studied medicine in Hungary and received an absolutorium from the University of Budapest. In Hungary, he was mentored by biochemists Albert Szent-Györgyi and Kalman Laki. Owing to events related to the Cold War, Lorand left Budapest for England in December 1948, just after finishing his medical school coursework. The biomolecular structure department at the University of Leeds was chaired by physicist and molecular biologist William Astbury. He became interested in Lorand's prior work on the viscosity of fibrin. Lorand earned a Ph.D. in biomolecular structure from Leeds in 1951.

Lorand was a professor at Wayne State University, and then he came to Northwestern and spent many years in the departments of chemistry and molecular biosciences. In 1993, he transferred to Northwestern's Feinberg School of Medicine. Lorand is associated with the Feinberg Cardiovascular Research Institute. He was the co-editor of Proteolytic Enzymes, a volume of the scientific series Methods in Enzymology. He was a co-discoverer of factor XIII, which was formerly referred to as Laki–Lorand factor and fibrin stabilizing factor.

In 1983, Lorand was awarded an honorary Doctor of Science from the University of Illinois at Chicago. He was elected to the National Academy of Sciences in 1987.

Lorand met Joyce Bruner, also a scientist, in 1953. They later married, and Joyce Bruner-Lorand collaborated with her husband on NIH-funded studies at Northwestern for many years. Joyce died in 2010.

Lorand died in 2018.
