= TGM6 =

Protein-coding gene in the species Homo sapiens

Identifiers
- Aliases: TGM6, SCA35, TG6, TGM3L, TGY, dJ734P14.3, transglutaminase 6
- External IDs: OMIM: 613900; MGI: 3044321; GeneCards: TGM6
Enzyme activity
EC #	BRENDA	ExPASy	KEGG	MetaCyc
2.3.2.13	↗	↗	↗	↗

Gene location (Human)
Chr.	Chromosome 20 (human)
Band	20p13	Start	2,380,901 bp
Band	20p13	End	2,432,753 bp

Gene location (Mouse)
Chr.	Chromosome 2 (mouse)
Band	2|2 F1	Start	129,954,336 bp
Band	2|2 F1	End	129,996,152 bp
RNA expression pattern
Bgee	Human / Mouse (ortholog); Top expressed in: epithelium of colon; bone marrow cell; tonsil; striated muscle tissue; skeletal muscle tissue; gonad; urinary bladder; mammary gland; breast; lactiferous gland / Top expressed in: hair follicle; lip; embryo; skin of back; zygote; skin of abdomen; secondary oocyte; spermatocyte; renal corpuscle; spermatid; More reference expression data
BioGPS	n/a
Gene ontology
Molecular function	transferase activity; acyltransferase activity; protein-glutamine gamma-glutamyltransferase activity; metal ion binding
Cellular component	cytoplasm
Biological process	peptide cross-linking
Sources:Amigo / QuickGO
Orthologs
Databases	NCBI: entry; OMA: entry
Species	Human	Mouse
Entrez	343641	241636
Ensembl	ENSG00000166948	ENSMUSG00000027403
UniProt	O95932	n/a
RefSeq (mRNA)	NM_198994; NM_001254734	NM_001289747; NM_001289748; NM_001289749; NM_177726
RefSeq (protein)	NP_001241663; NP_945345	n/a
Location (UCSC)	Chr 20: 2.38 – 2.43 Mb	Chr 2: 129.95 – 130 Mb
PubMed search
- Wikidata
View/Edit Human	View/Edit Mouse

Transglutaminase 6 is a protein that in humans is encoded by the TGM6 gene.

== Function and Clinical Significance ==
The protein encoded by this gene belongs to the transglutaminase superfamily. It catalyzes the cross-linking of proteins and the conjugation of polyamines to proteins. Mutations in this gene are associated with spinocerebellar ataxia type 35 (SCA35). Alternatively spliced transcript variants encoding different isoforms have been found for this gene. [provided by RefSeq, Dec 2011].

Mutations in TGM6 cause acute myeloid leukaemia. The presence of antibodies against TG6 is statistically related to gluten ataxia, amongst other conditions.
