= Streptomyces mobaraensis =

Scientific classification
- Domain: Bacteria
- Kingdom: Bacillati
- Phylum: Actinomycetota
- Class: Actinomycetes
- Order: Streptomycetales
- Family: Streptomycetaceae
- Genus: Streptomyces
- Species: S. mobaraensis

Binomial name
- Streptomyces mobaraensis (Nagatsu and Suzuki 1963) Witt and Stackebrandt 1991

Type strain
- ACC 7082, ATCC 29032, BCRC 12165, CBS 199.75, CBS 207.78, CCRC 12165, CGMCC 4.1719, CGMCC 4.1851, CIP 108144, DSM 40847, IFO 13819, IPCR 16-22, IPV 2058, JCM 4168, KCC S-0168, KCCS-0168, NBRC 13819, NCIB 11159, NCIMB 11159, NRRL B-3729, RIA 1627, Suzuki IPCR 16-22, VKM Ac-928, VKPM AC-1343, VTT E-032076

Synonyms
- Streptomyces ladakanum (Hanka et al. 1966) Witt and Stackebrandt 1991; "Streptomyces mobaraensis" Nagatsu and Suzuki 1963; Streptoverticillium ladakanum corrig. Hanka et al. 1966 (Approved Lists 1980); Streptoverticillium ladakanus Hanka et al. 1966 (Approved Lists 1980); Streptoverticillium mobaraense (Nagatsu and Suzuki 1963) Locci et al. 1969 (Approved Lists 1980)

Species of bacterium

Streptomyces mobaraensis is a spore forming bacterium species from the genus of Streptomyces. Streptomyces mobaraensis produces bleomycin, detoxin, piericidin A, piericidin B, reticulol and transglutaminase. Streptomyces mobaraensis is used in the food industry to produce transglutaminase to texture meat and fish products.

== See also ==
- List of Streptomyces species
