= Piericidin A =

Names
- Preferred IUPAC name 2-[(2E,5E,7E,9R,10R,11E)-10-Hydroxy-3,7,9,11-tetramethyltrideca-2,5,7,11-tetraen-1-yl]-5,6-dimethoxy-3-methylpyridin-4(1H)-one
- Other names Piericidin A1, AR-054

Identifiers
CAS Number	2738-64-9
3D model (JSmol)	Interactive image
ChEBI	CHEBI:138511
ChemSpider	4942360
ECHA InfoCard	100.162.726
MeSH	Piericidin+A
PubChem CID	6437838
UNII	8VT513UJ9R
CompTox Dashboard (EPA)	DTXSID80880044
- InChI: InChI=1S/C25H37NO4/c1-9-18(4)22(27)19(5)15-17(3)12-10-11-16(2)13-14-21-20(6)23(28)24(29-7)25(26-21)30-8/h9-10,12-13,15,19,22,27H,11,14H2,1-8H3,(H,26,28)/b12-10+,16-13+,17-15+,18-9+/t19-,22+/m1/s1 Key: BBLGCDSLCDDALX-LKGBESRRSA-N
- SMILES: C/C=C(\C)/[C@@H]([C@H](C)/C=C(\C)/C=C/C/C(=C/Cc1c(c(=O)c(c([nH]1)OC)OC)C)/C)O

Properties
Chemical formula	C_{25}H_{37}NO_{4}
Molar mass	415.574 g·mol^{−1}
- Except where otherwise noted, data are given for materials in their standard state (at 25 °C [77 °F], 100 kPa). verify (what is ?) Infobox references

Piericidin A is an antibiotic agent. It was discovered from Streptomyces mobaraensis. Being an inhibitor of NADH dehydrogenase, it inhibits electron transfer; its structure resembles that of the ubiquinone, therefore it competes with Q_{B} for binding sites in NADH dehydrogenase as well as photosystem II.
