= Boneless Fish =

Japanese frozen, deboned fish food brand

Boneless Fish is a fish-based frozen food brand and grocery product, the process in the production of which was invented by Dairei Corporation (大冷株式会社) of Japan in 1998. It is essentially a fish that has been scaled, gutted and deboned by a skilled worker before being reassembled with a transglutaminase to look like a dressed fish (fish gutted and with its head and fins removed). The fish is then flash-frozen and packaged, remaining uncooked.

It is possible to manufacture a boneless fish with head and fins intact, but it had been found to be impractical.

== Purpose ==
The Boneless Fish product was initially intended to feed three groups: the elderly, hospital patients, and schoolchildren. It differs from an ordinary frozen fish fillet in that the content of a Boneless Fish pack looks just like a dressed fish. The product is cooked in the same manner as an ordinary fish.

Dairei began to market it to families in 2002. It had been found to be advantageous to consumers in that aside from being easy to prepare, cooking the brand's boneless fish at home—as against the usual market fish—generates a very small amount of waste.

== Production ==
The production of Boneless Fish is labor-intensive. Dairei set up HACCP-certified factories in Thailand, China and Vietnam, where its workers cut open the fish and use a pair of tweezers to remove the bones. The end product is then examined to make sure that it is free of bones and then "glued back together" using a food-grade enzyme produced by Ajinomoto.

The Ajinomoto binding agent used in Boneless Fish is a transglutaminase (product name: Activa TG-B) separated from a culture of Streptoverticillium mobaraense. It works by binding the collagen in the fish tissue. At temperatures under 5 °C, it may take several hours for the enzyme to do its job properly.

== Similar products ==
The popularity of boneless fish inspired another technology-intensive Japanese product, "Fish with Delicious Bones" (骨までおいしい魚; honemade oishii sakana), which has been on sale since 2004. The fish, in the form of a butterfly fillet, is prepared by a patented process that uses heat and pressure to tenderize fish bones. The entire fish, including the head and fins, becomes completely edible, much like what happens to canned sardines. It is a joint claimed invention of Maruha Corporation (株式会社マルハ) and Miyajima Soysauce Corporation (宮島醤油株式会社). This cooking process retains flavor and texture after freezeing thawing, and the fish can be eaten with bones, after they become soft thanks to the cooking and seasoning technique. The process include the use of malic acid and citric acid for seasoning, then cooking the fish and seasoning liquid between 90°C and 96°C and finally rapid cooling to at least -5°C in less than 15 minutes.

Another similar product is "Cold Set Bound Fish Kebabs", made from alternating layers of salmon and cod "glued together" by transglutaminase.
