= Coagulation factor XIII A chain =

Protein found in humans

F13A1
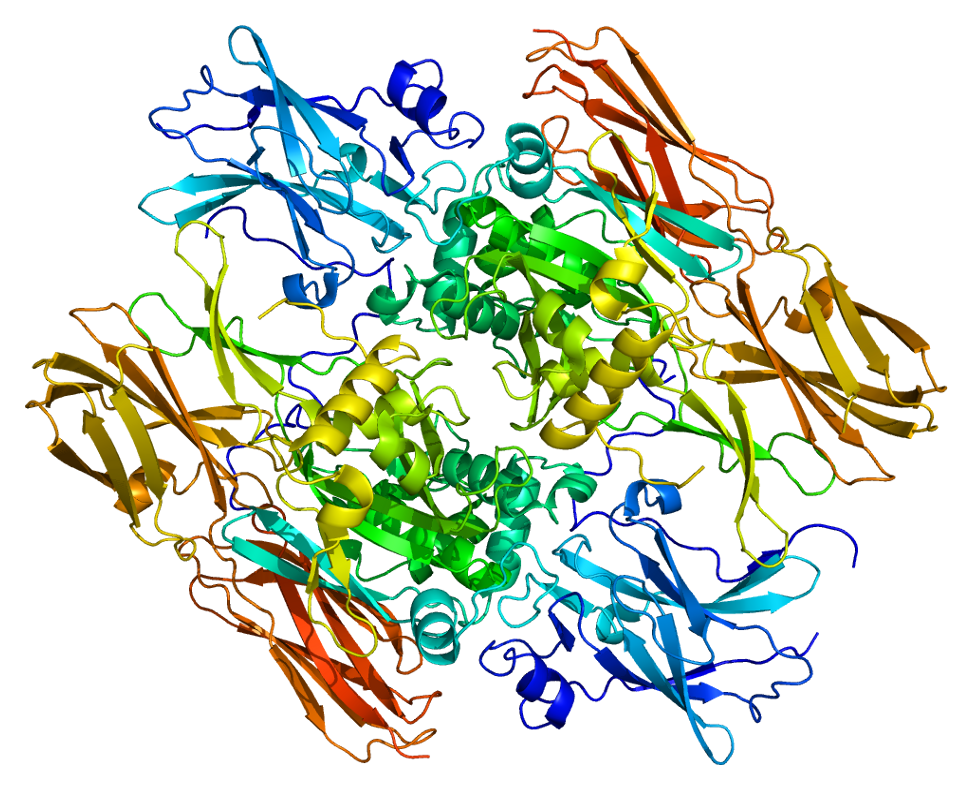

Identifiers
- Aliases: F13A1, F13A, coagulation factor XIII A chain
- External IDs: OMIM: 134570; MGI: 1921395; GeneCards: F13A1
Available structures
PDB	Ortholog search: PDBe RCSB
PDB	List of PDB id codes 1EVU, 1EX0, 1F13, 1FIE, 1GGT, 1GGU, 1GGY, 1QRK, 4KTY
Enzyme activity
EC #	BRENDA	ExPASy	KEGG	MetaCyc
2.3.2.13	↗	↗	↗	↗

Gene location (Human)
Chr.	Chromosome 6 (human)
Band	6p25.1	Start	6,144,084 bp
Band	6p25.1	End	6,321,013 bp

Gene location (Mouse)
Chr.	Chromosome 13 (mouse)
Band	13|13 A3.3	Start	37,051,152 bp
Band	13|13 A3.3	End	37,234,220 bp
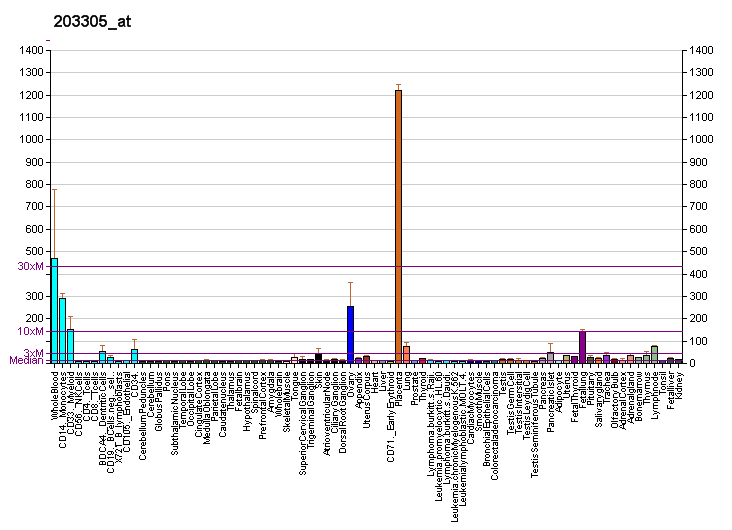
RNA expression pattern
Bgee	Human / Mouse (ortholog); Top expressed in: monocyte; pericardium; placenta; decidua; synovial joint; right coronary artery; skin of thigh; skin of hip; gastric mucosa; gallbladder / Top expressed in: stroma of bone marrow; ankle; intercostal muscle; umbilical cord; dermis; tibiofemoral joint; skin of external ear; trachea; blood; skin of back; More reference expression data
BioGPS	More reference expression data
Gene ontology
Molecular function	protein-glutamine gamma-glutamyltransferase activity; acyltransferase activity; metal ion binding; transferase activity
Cellular component	cytoplasm; platelet alpha granule lumen; blood microparticle; extracellular region; collagen-containing extracellular matrix
Biological process	peptide cross-linking; blood coagulation, fibrin clot formation; platelet degranulation; hemostasis; blood coagulation; cytokine-mediated signaling pathway
Sources:Amigo / QuickGO
Orthologs
Databases	NCBI: entry; OMA: entry
Species	Human	Mouse
Entrez	2162	74145
Ensembl	ENSG00000124491	ENSMUSG00000039109
UniProt	P00488	Q8BH61
RefSeq (mRNA)	NM_000129	NM_001166391; NM_028784
RefSeq (protein)	NP_000120	NP_001159863; NP_083060
Location (UCSC)	Chr 6: 6.14 – 6.32 Mb	Chr 13: 37.05 – 37.23 Mb
PubMed search
- Wikidata
View/Edit Human	View/Edit Mouse

Coagulation factor XIII A chain, (FXIIIa) is a protein that in humans is encoded by the F13A1 gene.

== Function ==
This gene encodes the coagulation factor XIII A subunit. Coagulation factor XIII is the last zymogen to become activated in the blood coagulation cascade. Plasma factor XIII is a heterotetramer composed of 2 A subunits and 2 B subunits. The A subunits have catalytic function, and the B subunits do not have enzymatic activity and may serve as plasma carrier molecules. Platelet factor XIII is composed of just 2 A subunits, which are identical to those of plasma origin. Upon cleavage of the activation peptide by thrombin and in the presence of calcium ion, the plasma factor XIII dissociates its B subunits and yields the same active enzyme, factor XIIIa, as platelet factor XIII. This enzyme acts as a transglutaminase to catalyze the formation of gamma-glutamyl-epsilon-lysine crosslinking between fibrin molecules, thus stabilizing the fibrin clot. It also crosslinks alpha-2-plasmin inhibitor, or fibronectin, to the alpha chains of fibrin. Factor XIII deficiency is classified into two categories: type I deficiency, characterized by the lack of both the A and B subunits; and type II deficiency, characterized by the lack of the A subunit alone. These defects can result in a lifelong bleeding tendency, defective wound healing, and habitual abortion.

== Interactions ==
Coagulation factor XIII A chain has been shown to interact with coagulation factor XIII B chain.
