= Metastasis suppressor =

Protein that acts to slow or prevent metastases

A metastasis suppressor is a protein that acts to slow or prevent metastases (secondary tumors) from spreading in the body of an organism with cancer. Metastasis is one of the most lethal cancer processes. This process is responsible for about ninety percent of human cancer deaths. Proteins that act to slow or prevent metastases are different from those that act to suppress tumor growth. Genes for about a dozen such proteins are known in humans and other animals.

== Background ==
The treatment of cancer usually aims to destroy and/or stop the growth of the primary tumor. Major improvements in the methods of surgery, radiation, and chemotherapy have taken place, but corresponding improvements in patient survival have not always followed. Treatments that focus on the primary cancer typically do not address metastasis.

Metastasis suppressors act by different mechanisms than tumor suppressors and do not affect primary tumors. Tumor suppressors, however, also inhibit metastasis, since metastasis is dependent upon tumorigenicity.

Metastasis suppressors were first identified using microcell-mediated chromosome transfer (MMCT), which introduces chromosomes into intact recipient cells. Chromosomes 1, 6, 7, 8, 10, 11, 12, 16 and 17 harbor metastasis suppressor genes.

MicroRNAs (miRNAs) are a class of gene regulators that bind the 3′ untranslated regions of target messenger RNAs, leading to either suppression of their translation or acceleration of their degradation. In cell MDA-MB-231 and its metastatic variant, six miRNAs displayed lower expression in metastatic cells. Among them, miR-335 and miR-126 suppress metastasis without affecting primary tumor growth. miR-335 targets multiple pathways, including SOX4, MERTK, PTPRN2 and TNC, which contribute to metastasis-suppression. miR-335 expression is correlated with metastasis-free survival in clinical breast cancer.

== Clinical applications ==
Metastasis suppressors can potentially serve as prognostic markers, therapeutic targets and predictors for treatment response.

=== Prognosis ===
High NM23 expression is correlated with good prognosis in multiple tumor types, including breast cancer. KAI1, PEBP1 and RECK expression correlate with improved survival in multiple tumor types, including colorectal cancer. High expression of CTGF is correlated with improved survival in colorectal cancer, non-small cell lung carcinoma and gallbladder cancer, but the correlation is reversed in esophageal cancer and glioma.

=== Targets ===
Patients with NM23 -positive ovarian cancer respond better to cisplatin than patients with NM23-negative tumors and esophageal squamous cell carcinoma. NM23 expression is correlated with increased survival after cisplatin treatment following surgery.

Unlike tumor suppressors, most metastasis suppressors are downregulated in clinical tumor samples rather than mutated. Activation of these metastasis suppressors can potentially block metastasis and improve survival. The promoter region of NM23 contains glucocorticoid response elements that can elevate NM23 expression. Treating human breast cancer cells with dexamethasone medroxyprogesterone acetate (MPA) increases NM23 expression.

== Genes ==
Genes for about a dozen metastasis-suppressing proteins are known in humans and other animals, including BRMS1, CRSP3, DRG1, KAI1, SDPR, KISS1, NM23 and various TIMPs. Most act by altering aspects of signal transduction.

- NM23 is a suppressor active in melanoma, breast and colon cancers and apparently inhibits the functioning of a kinase enzyme that promotes cell division. NM23 has eight family members. NM23-H1 and NM23-H2 suppress metastasis in multiple tumor types. NM23 expression can serve as a potential prognostic marker for survival in breast, ovarian, melanoma, gastric, hepatocellular and non-small cell carcinoma. It affects the MAPK and cytoskeleton-organizing cellular pathways, which contribute to its metastasis-suppressing functions.
- MKK4 is a suppressor active in prostate and ovarian cancers It apparently functions by facilitating apoptosis, or death of abnormal cells such as cancer cells.
- KAI1 is found in prostate and breast cancers. It forms complexes with proteins called integrins. Integrins link cells together. The complex formation may inhibit detachment and migration of cancer cells.
- BRMS1 promotes the activity of the gap junctions of cells. BRMS1 suppresses metastasis in multiple tumor types including ovarian, bladder, melanoma and non-small cell lung carcinoma. Clinically BRMS1 expression correlates with survival in breast cancer and non-small cell lung carcinoma.
- SDPR functions as a metastasis suppressor in breast cancer, potentially by priming cells to apoptosis. Cancer cells suppress the gene via promoter DNA methylation hence exemplifies the significance of epigenetic changes in cancer progression.
- KISS1 is found in melanoma and breast cancers. It acts by synthesizing a protein receptor.
- RHoGD12 is active in bladder cancer and inhibits proteins that aid in cancer cell migration. RhoGDI2 suppresses endothelin 1 (ET1), a vasoconstrictor correlated with higher clinical stage in bladder cancer.
- CRSP3 and VDUP1 are both active in melanoma. CRSP3 is a co-activator of genes involved in cancer growth, while VDUP1 inhibits a protein involved in cell proliferation.
- Ectopic expression of Krüppel-like factor 17 (KLF17) in highly metastatic 4T1 cells suppresses their metastatic potential without affecting primary tumor growth in a mouse model. KLF17 suppression promotes tumor cell epithelial-mesenchymal transition (EMT), which leads to metastasis. Transcription factor Id1 is a direct target of KLF17 and mediates its metastatic functions. KLF17 expression is significantly downregulated and Id1 expression is upregulated in breast cancer metastasis.
- GAS1 is found in melanoma. In poorly metastatic B16-F0 mouse melanoma cells, GAS1 knockdown promoted metastasis without affecting primary tumor growth. GAS1 suppresses metastasis by promoting apoptosis in disseminated cancer cells at secondary organs. Its expression is downregulated in metastatic clinical samples.
- Primary tumor samples of colorectal cancer patients with liver metastasis showed gain of chromosomes 7p, 8q, 13q and 20q and loss of chromosomes 1p, 8p, 9p, 14q, 17p and 22q. Genes that are located in the regions of chromosomal loss include MAP2K4, LLGL1, FBLN1, ELAC2, ALDH3A2, ALDH3A1, SHMT1, ARSA, WNT7B, TNFRSF13B, UPK3A, TYMP, RASD1, PEMT and TOP3A. These genes can potentially serve as metastasis suppressors.
- In a basal-like primary breast cancer, mutations in SNED1 and FLNC influenced metastasis.

== Impact ==
Metastasis suppressor genes may offer mechanistic insight for guiding specific therapeutic strategies, which may include drug-induced reactivation of metastasis suppressor genes and their signaling pathways. Clinical assessment of metastasis suppressor gene product status in disseminated cancer cells may improve prognosis accuracy in patients with clinically localized disease. These proteins are different from ones that act to suppress tumor growth.
