= Synapsin I =

Protein-coding gene in the species Homo sapiens

SYN1
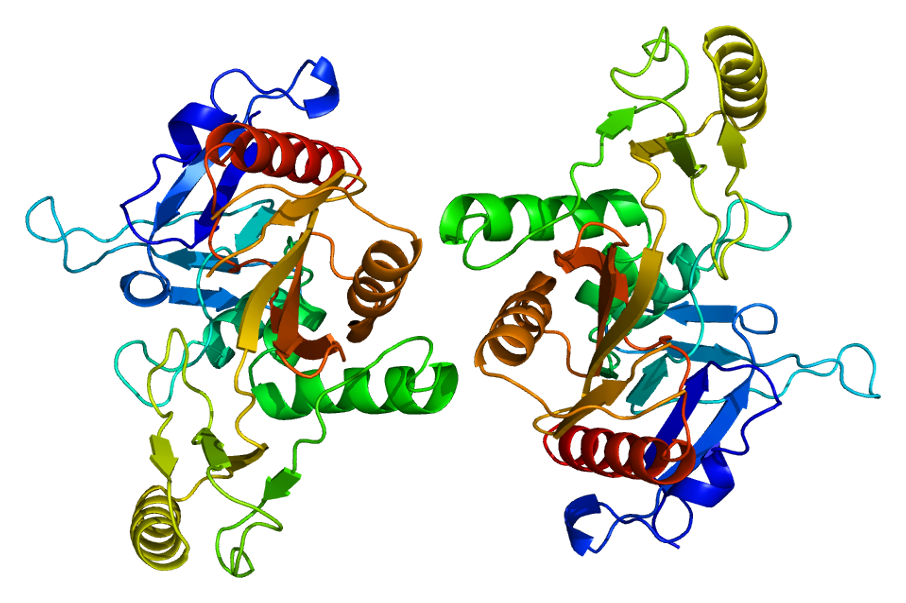

Identifiers
- Aliases: SYN1, SYN1a, SYN1b, SYNI, Synapsin I, MRX50, EPILX
- External IDs: OMIM: 313440; MGI: 98460; GeneCards: SYN1

Gene location (Human)
Chr.	X chromosome (human)
Band	Xp11.3-p11.23	Start	47,571,901 bp
Band	Xp11.3-p11.23	End	47,619,857 bp

Gene location (Mouse)
Chr.	X chromosome (mouse)
Band	X A1.3|X 16.37 cM	Start	20,726,750 bp
Band	X A1.3|X 16.37 cM	End	20,787,243 bp
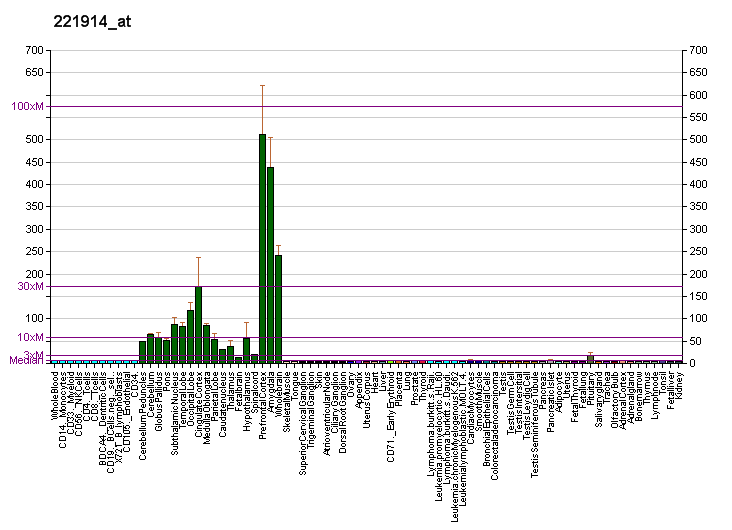
RNA expression pattern
Bgee	Human / Mouse (ortholog); Top expressed in: right frontal lobe; right hemisphere of cerebellum; prefrontal cortex; anterior cingulate cortex; Brodmann area 9; postcentral gyrus; Brodmann area 46; superior frontal gyrus; Region I of hippocampus proper; amygdala / Top expressed in: primary visual cortex; superior frontal gyrus; subiculum; piriform cortex; dentate gyrus of hippocampal formation granule cell; prefrontal cortex; pontine nuclei; primary motor cortex; superior colliculus; hippocampus proper; More reference expression data
BioGPS	More reference expression data
Gene ontology
Molecular function	transporter activity; calcium-dependent protein binding; catalytic activity; protein binding; actin binding; ATP binding; protein kinase binding
Cellular component	cytosol; Golgi apparatus; postsynaptic density; synaptic vesicle; myelin sheath; synapse; synaptic vesicle membrane; presynaptic active zone; axon; cell junction; terminal bouton; dendrite; intracellular organelle; synaptonemal complex; anchored component of synaptic vesicle membrane; presynapse; cytoskeleton; Schaffer collateral - CA1 synapse; extrinsic component of synaptic vesicle membrane
Biological process	regulation of neurotransmitter secretion; regulation of synaptic vesicle exocytosis; neurotransmitter secretion; chemical synaptic transmission; synaptic vesicle clustering; neuron development; synapse organization; regulation of synaptic vesicle cycle; synaptic vesicle cycle
Sources:Amigo / QuickGO
Orthologs
Databases	NCBI: entry; OMA: entry
Species	Human	Mouse
Entrez	6853	20964
Ensembl	ENSG00000008056	ENSMUSG00000037217
UniProt	P17600	O88935
RefSeq (mRNA)	NM_133499; NM_006950	NM_001110780; NM_013680
RefSeq (protein)	NP_008881; NP_598006	NP_001104250; NP_038708
Location (UCSC)	Chr X: 47.57 – 47.62 Mb	Chr X: 20.73 – 20.79 Mb
PubMed search
- Wikidata
View/Edit Human	View/Edit Mouse

Synapsin I, is the collective name for Synapsin Ia and Synapsin Ib, two nearly identical phosphoproteins that in humans are encoded by the SYN1 gene. In its phosphorylated form, Synapsin I may also be referred to as phosphosynaspin I. Synapsin I is the first of the proteins in the synapsin family of phosphoproteins in the synaptic vesicles present in the central and peripheral nervous systems. Synapsin Ia and Ib are close in length and almost the same in makeup; however, Synapsin Ib stops short of the last segment of the C-terminal in the amino acid sequence found in Synapsin Ia.

== Protein ==
The synapsin I protein is a member of the synapsin family that are neuronal phosphoproteins which associate with the cytoplasmic surface of synaptic vesicles. Family members are characterized by common protein domains, and they are implicated in synaptogenesis and the modulation of neurotransmitter release, suggesting a potential role in several neuropsychiatric diseases.

The phosphoprotein plays a role in regulation of axonogenesis and synaptogenesis. The protein serves as a substrate for several different protein kinases and phosphorylation may function in the regulation of this protein in the nerve terminal.

Synapsin I is found in two isoforms of the protein, Synapsin Ia and Synapsin Ib, with Synapsin Ib being a slightly shorter version of the protein. Both Synapsin I proteins are highly basic with a pI in the range of 10.3 and 10.2, respectively. Both isoforms are phosphorylated at identical locations within their protein sequences at the same three serine residues.

Synapsin I phosphoproteins make up approximately 6% of the total protein in synaptic vesicles. Among bovine, rat, and human it has been shown to be 95% homologous, with the central 'C' domain evolutionarily conserved. This phosphoprotein is loosely associated with the vesicular membrance and is easily dissociated by treatment with a salt, versus a detergent being required for its removal from the membrane.

== Structure ==
Synapsin I proteins are made up of a globular portion at the N-terminal and an elongated C-terminal domain, rendering them largely elongated. Synapsin Ib has the same protein domains as synapsin Ia, however synapsin Ib lacks the last C-terminal segment, making it slightly shorter in its elongated domain. 706 amino acids comprise synapsin Ia, and starting from the N-terminal, the same first 670 amino acids comprise synapsin Ib.

Rich in the amino acids proline and glycine, the compositional and structural natures of this protein are somewhat similar to collagen. This aided in the early determination of its structure using collagenase, which was later confirmed by amino acid sequencing and modern techniques. Cleavage of synapsin I by collagenase fragments the elongated C-terminal and leaves the globular N-terminal domain intact.

Amino acid sequencing has shown that synapsin I has common N-terminals across both isoforms and shares the same N-terminal as synapsin II. Synapsin I isoforms differ from synapsin II isoforms in their C-terminal domains as well. Further research has been done on the interactions of synapsin I, synapsin II, and synapsin III with each other to create heterodimers of the proteins in COS cells.

== Function ==
Synapsin I is present in the nerve terminal of axons, specifically in the membranes of synaptic vesicles based on immunocytochemistry. This phosphoprotein is as an endogenous substrate bound to the vesicular membrane. It is phosphorylated by four known classes of protein kinases including those activated by cAMP, calcium/calmodulin, mitogen, and cyclin. Both isoforms have the same six phosphorylation sites:

The N-terminal globular domain contains three sites: the cAMP-dependent protein kinase-mediated phosphorylation site near the end in domain A, and two sites further in, in domain B, mediated by mitogen-activated protein kinase (MAP kinase). The tail portion of the protein, the C-terminal end, bears three phosphorylation sites: two sites at which calcium/calmodulin dependent protein kinase II acts, and a third site at which MAP kinase and cyclin-dependent protein kinase (CDK) acts. Specificity for calcium/calmodulin dependent protein kinase binding to Synapsin I is very high in comparison to other substrate proteins. Cyclic AMP-dependent protein kinase is unique in its mechanism of activation. The protein kinase is composed of two regulatory (R) subunits and two catalytic (C) subunits, creating a tetrameric holoenzyme. Cyclic AMP binds to the regulatory subunits of cAMP-dependent protein kinase and causes the dissociation of its regulatory subunits from the catalytic subunits, generating the active form of the kinase. This active form of the protein kinase catalyses the phosphorylation of Synapsin I. The phosphorylated form of Synapsin I is referred to as phosphosynapsin I.

Depolarization of the presynaptic membrane induces a calcium ion influx into the axonal nerve terminal of neurons, and increases the intracellular concentration of calcium ions. Synapsin I was shown to be phosphorylated by this calcium influx. The calcium ion, Ca^{2+}, binds to calmodulin to form a calcium/calmodulin complex which then activates the calcium/calmodulin-dependent protein kinase, in turn triggering phosphorylation. Calcium/calmodulin-dependent phosphorylation of synapsin I causes dissociation of synapsin I from the vesicular membrane.

In the nerve terminal ending, there are two pools of synaptic vesicles, the reserve pool and the ready-release pool. The reserve pool refers to the synaptic vesicles that are not ready to release neurotransmitters and the ready-release pool refers to the vesicles which are primed to release their neurotransmitters across the presynaptic cytoplasmic membrane and into the synaptic cleft. The removal of Synapsin I from synaptic vesicles is thought to mobilize synaptic vesicles from the reserve pool to the release-ready pool, thereby modulating neurotransmitter release. Since it is only present in the vesicles in the reserve pool, the non-phosphorylated form of Synapsin I is considered to be an inhibitory regulator of neurotransmission.

== Interactions ==
The synapsin I protein has been shown to interact with NOS1AP and SYN2.

== Clinical significance ==
Mutations in the SYN1 gene may be associated with X-linked disorders with primary neuronal degeneration such as Rett syndrome.

== Discovery ==
The original member of the synapsin family, Synapsin I, is the first neuronal synaptic membrane protein that was initially observed in 1973, by Tetsufumi Ueda in the laboratory of Nobel Prize winner Paul Greengard. Originally named Protein I, Synapsin I, it was detected through radioactive phosphorus (P-32) incorporated through protein phosphorylation, catalyzed by a cyclic AMP-dependent protein kinase (enzyme) naturally found in the neuronal membrane at the synaptic cleft in rats. In 1977, this first synaptic phosphoprotein was also purified and first characterized by Tetsufumi Ueda at the same laboratory at Yale University under Paul Greengard.

The novel techniques used to discover Synapsin I, were a combination of SDS gel electrophoresis and autoradiography developed by Tetsufumi Ueda in Greengard’s laboratory, that significantly enhanced the way proteins activated by phosphorylation could be observed. More specifically, this was accomplished by autoradiography measuring the radioactivity of the individual protein bands phosphorylated by radioactive adenosine triphosphate. Hiroo Maeno, a lab colleague, assisted with the sample preparations and radio-labelling ATP with P-32 at the gamma phosphate.

The discovery of the synaptic membrane protein and the methodology by which it was discovered, are considered both groundbreaking advancements in the analysis of phosphorylated proteins, and introduced the identification of specific proteins.

Synapsin I is also the first collagenous protein to be described in the nervous system.
