= Synapsin 2 =

Protein-coding gene in the species Homo sapiens

SYN2
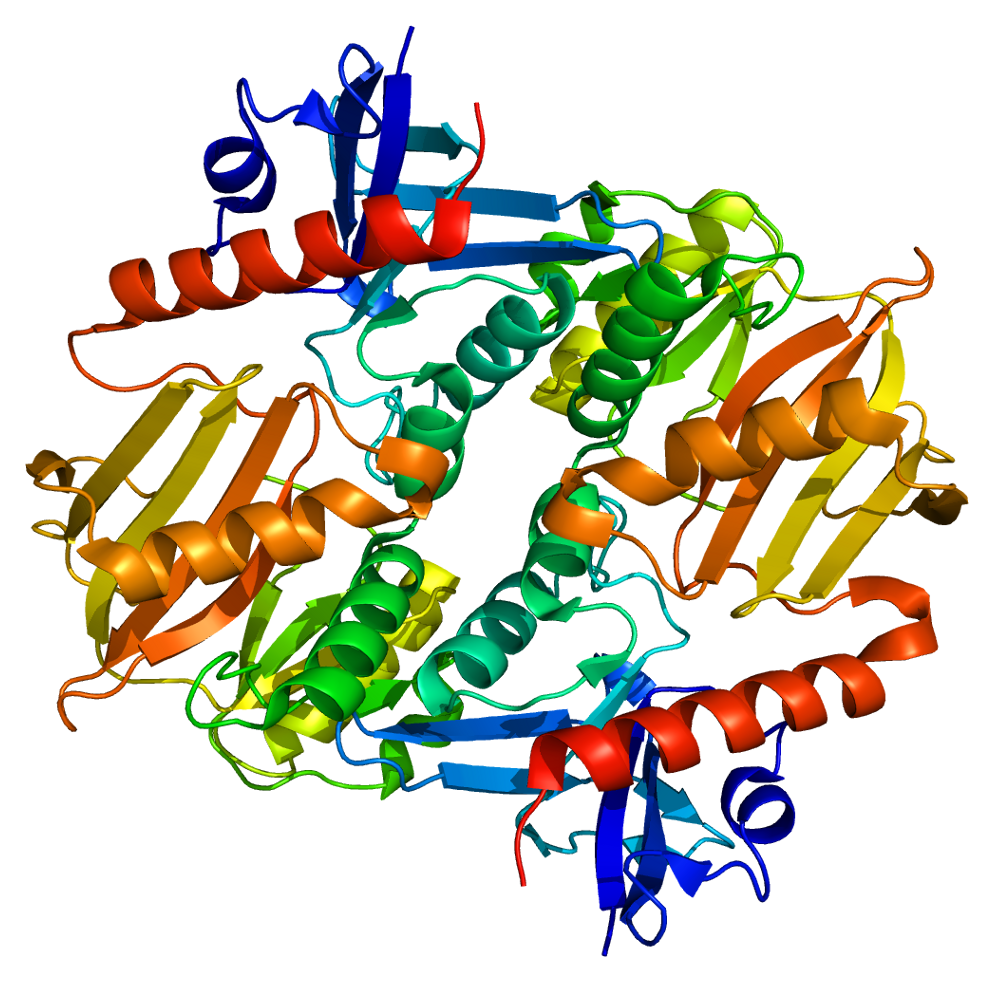

Identifiers
- Aliases: SYN2, SYNII, Synapsin 2, synapsin II
- External IDs: OMIM: 600755; MGI: 103020; GeneCards: SYN2

Gene location (Human)
Chr.	Chromosome 3 (human)
Band	3p25.2	Start	12,004,388 bp
Band	3p25.2	End	12,192,032 bp

Gene location (Mouse)
Chr.	Chromosome 6 (mouse)
Band	6 E3|6 53.2 cM	Start	115,111,863 bp
Band	6 E3|6 53.2 cM	End	115,258,967 bp
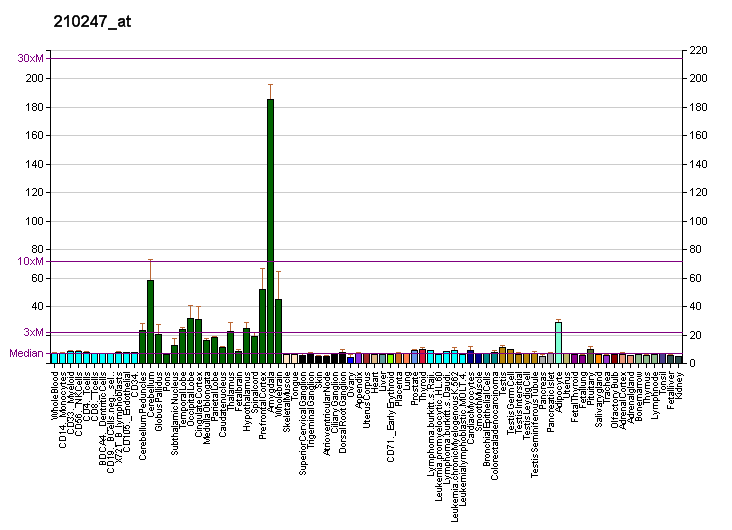
RNA expression pattern
Bgee	Human / Mouse (ortholog); Top expressed in: middle temporal gyrus; endothelial cell; Brodmann area 23; superior frontal gyrus; entorhinal cortex; postcentral gyrus; pons; right frontal lobe; prefrontal cortex; dorsolateral prefrontal cortex / Top expressed in: subiculum; dentate gyrus of hippocampal formation granule cell; anterior amygdaloid area; medial dorsal nucleus; olfactory tubercle; dorsomedial hypothalamic nucleus; ventromedial nucleus; piriform cortex; dorsal tegmental nucleus; pontine nuclei; More reference expression data
BioGPS	More reference expression data
Gene ontology
Molecular function	ATP binding
Cellular component	cell junction; synapse; synaptic vesicle membrane; synaptic vesicle; plasma membrane; postsynaptic density; SNARE complex; myelin sheath; Schaffer collateral - CA1 synapse; glutamatergic synapse
Biological process	neurotransmitter secretion; chemical synaptic transmission; synaptic vesicle clustering; synaptic vesicle cycle; calcium-ion regulated exocytosis
Sources:Amigo / QuickGO
Orthologs
Databases	NCBI: entry; OMA: entry
Species	Human	Mouse
Entrez	6854	20965
Ensembl	ENSG00000157152	ENSMUSG00000009394
UniProt	Q92777	Q64332
RefSeq (mRNA)	NM_003178; NM_133625	NM_001111015; NM_013681; NM_001326560
RefSeq (protein)	NP_003169; NP_598328	NP_001104485; NP_001313489; NP_038709
Location (UCSC)	Chr 3: 12 – 12.19 Mb	Chr 6: 115.11 – 115.26 Mb
PubMed search
- Wikidata
View/Edit Human	View/Edit Mouse

Synapsin II is the collective name for synapsin IIa and synapsin IIb, two nearly identical phosphoproteins in the synapsin family that in humans are encoded by the SYN2 gene. Synapsins associate as endogenous substrates to the surface of synaptic vesicles and act as key modulators in neurotransmitter release across the presynaptic membrane of axonal neurons in the nervous system.

== Gene ==
Alternative splicing of the SYN2 gene results in two transcripts. The TIMP4 gene is located within an intron of this gene and is transcribed in the opposite direction.

== Protein ==
Synapsin II is a member of the synapsin family. Synapsins encode neuronal phosphoproteins which associate with the cytoplasmic surface of synaptic vesicles. Family members are characterized by common protein domains, and they are implicated in synaptogenesis and the modulation of neurotransmitter release, suggesting a potential role in several neuropsychiatric diseases. This member of the synapsin family encodes a neuron-specific phosphoprotein that selectively binds to small synaptic vesicles in the presynaptic nerve terminal.

Synapsin II the collective name for two proteins, synapsin IIa and synapsin IIb, with synapsin IIa being the larger of the two isoforms. Their apparent molecular weights are 74,000 and 55,000 Da, per SDS gel electrophoresis. Synapsin II along with synapsin I comprise approximately 9% of the proteins in highly purified samples of synaptic vesicles.

== Structure ==
Synapsin II shares common domains within its amino acid sequence with other phosphoproteins in the synapsin family. Sharing the same N-terminal, synapsin II diverges from synapsin I in its C-terminal domains. It is much shorter than synapsin I and is missing most of the elongated domains seen in synapsin I. Roughly 70% of the amino acid residues are common between the two synapsins, which share common phosphorylation sites in the overlapping regions based on the homologous domains. Domain A of this neural protein contains phosphorylation sites for cAMP-dependent protein kinase and calcium/calmodulin-dependent protein kinase I, and domain B has two mitogen-activated protein kinase phosphorylation sites. At its B domain, between amino acids 43 and 121, synapsin II binds to a protein component in the cytosolic surface membrane of synaptic vesicles, organelles in neurons which carry neurotransmitters.

== Function ==
Synapsin II regulates synaptic function of neurons in the central and peripheral nervous system. Synapsin IIa is the only synapsin isoform of the six synapsin isoforms (synapsin I-III each with isoforms A and B), which has been shown to significantly reverse synaptic depression and have a restorative effect on the density of synaptic vesicles within synapsinless neurons. Because of its restorative effect, synapsin IIa is believed to play a fundamental role in synaptic vesicle mobilization and reserve pool regulation in presynaptic nerve terminals.

Lack of synapsins altogether in neurons, leads to behavioral alterations as well as epileptic-type seizures. The lack affects nervous signal transduction across excitatory and inhibitory synapses of neurons differently and is believed to be synapse-specific. Initial signal transduction appears to be unaffected by the lack of synapsins, but repeated stimulation of cultured synapsinless hippocampal neurons subsequently showed depressed responses at the excitatory synapse. At the inhibitory synapse, base signal transduction is reduced in neurons lacking pre-existing synapsins, but the reduced level of transduction is less affected by progressive stimulation.

However, the restoration of synapsin IIa to neurons without pre-existing synapsins, can partially recover presumably lost signal transduction and slow the depression of synaptic response with progressive stimulation. Its isoform synapsin IIb may have a similar but weaker effect. Through fluorescence and staining, it has been demonstrated that synapsin IIa increases the number and density of glutamatergic synaptic vesicles in the nerve terminal of neural axons. The recovery of nervous signal transduction is attributed to the increase in density of synaptic vesicles, which carry neurotransmitters to the synaptic cleft, and the amount of synaptic vesicles in the reserve pool in the presence of synapsin IIa. In turn, this is thought to increase the number of vesicles available for mobilization from the reserve pool to the ready-release pool. The reserve pool is the pool of synaptic vesicles which reside in the nerve terminal away from the presynaptic membrane of the axon, but are not in the ready to release or ready-release pool. Those vesicles in the ready-release pool reside very close to the presynaptic membrane and are primed to release neurotransmitters for nervous signal transduction.

== Interactions ==
The synapsin II protein has been shown to interact with SYN1.

== Clinical significance ==
Mutations in the SYN2 gene may be associated with abnormal presynaptic function and schizophrenia.
