= NOS1AP =

Protein found in humans

Identifiers
- Aliases: NOS1AP, 6330408P19Rik, CAPON, nitric oxide synthase 1 adaptor protein, NPHS22
- External IDs: OMIM: 605551; GeneCards: NOS1AP

Gene location (Human)
Chr.	Chromosome 1 (human)
Band	1q23.3	Start	162,069,691 bp
Band	1q23.3	End	162,370,475 bp
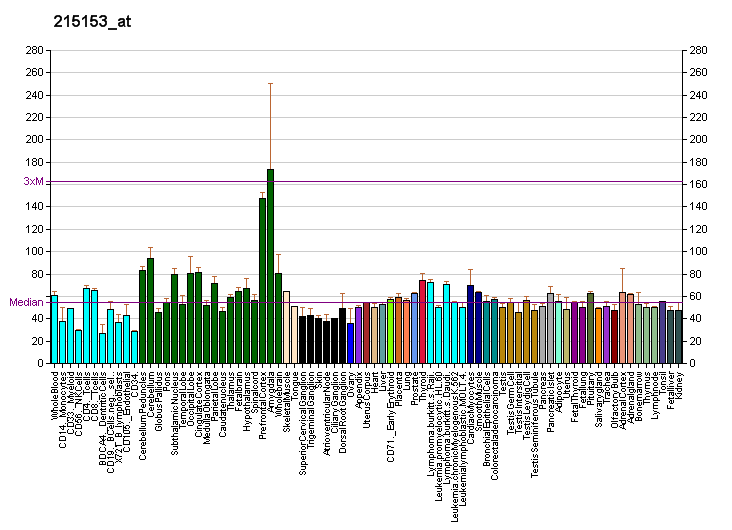
RNA expression pattern
Bgee	Human / Mouse (ortholog); Top expressed in: Region I of hippocampus proper; cerebellar vermis; frontal pole; orbitofrontal cortex; prefrontal cortex; paraflocculus of cerebellum; right hemisphere of cerebellum; superior frontal gyrus; Brodmann area 46; parietal lobe / n/a; More reference expression data
BioGPS	More reference expression data
Gene ontology
Molecular function	protein binding; nitric-oxide synthase binding
Cellular component	L-type voltage-gated calcium channel complex; cytosol; nuclear membrane; inward rectifier potassium channel complex; perinuclear region of cytoplasm; sarcolemma; nucleus; mitochondrion; caveola; Z discdkac; T-tubule; sarcoplasmic reticulum membrane; glutamatergic synapse
Biological process	positive regulation of peptidyl-cysteine S-nitrosylation; regulation of cardiac muscle cell action potential; positive regulation of nitric oxide biosynthetic process; regulation of nitric-oxide synthase activity; positive regulation of delayed rectifier potassium channel activity; positive regulation of gene expression; positive regulation of nitric oxide mediated signal transduction; positive regulation of nitric-oxide synthase activity; regulation of high voltage-gated calcium channel activity; positive regulation of potassium ion transmembrane transport; regulation of heart rate by chemical signal; positive regulation of voltage-gated potassium channel activity involved in ventricular cardiac muscle cell action potential repolarization; regulation of nitric oxide biosynthetic process; regulation of calcium ion transmembrane transport via high voltage-gated calcium channel; regulation of ventricular cardiac muscle cell membrane repolarization; postsynaptic actin cytoskeleton organization
Sources:Amigo / QuickGO
Orthologs
Databases	NCBI: entry; OMA: entry
Species	Human	Mouse
Entrez	9722	n/a
Ensembl	ENSG00000198929	n/a
UniProt	O75052	n/a
RefSeq (mRNA)	NM_014697; NM_001126060; NM_001164757	n/a
RefSeq (protein)	NP_001119532; NP_001158229; NP_055512	n/a
Location (UCSC)	Chr 1: 162.07 – 162.37 Mb	n/a
PubMed search		n/a
- Wikidata
View/Edit Human

Nitric oxide synthase 1 adaptor protein (NOS1AP) also known as carboxyl-terminal PDZ ligand of neuronal nitric oxide synthase protein (CAPON) is a protein that in humans is encoded by the NOS1AP gene.

This gene encodes a cytosolic protein that binds to the signaling molecule, neuronal nitric oxide synthase (nNOS). This protein has a C-terminal PDZ-binding domain that mediates interactions with nNOS and an N-terminal phosphotyrosine binding (PTB) domain that binds to the small monomeric G protein, Dexras1. Studies of the related mouse and rat proteins have shown that this protein functions as an adapter protein linking nNOS to specific targets, such as Dexras1 and the synapsins. NOS1AP polymorphisms has been associated with the QT interval length.

== Interactions ==
NOS1AP has been shown to interact with:

- LRP1,
- LRP2,
- NOS1,
- RASD1,
- SYN1
