= Combined oxidative phosphorylation defect type 17 =

Genetic disorder

Combined oxidative phosphorylation deficiency-17 (COXPD17) is a very rare autosomal recessive mitochondrial disease characterized primarily by onset of severe hypertrophic cardiomyopathy in the first year of life.

== Causes and inheritance ==
COXPD17 is caused by homozygous or compound heterozygous mutations in the ELAC2 gene that functions as a mitochondrial tRNA processing gene.

It follows an autosomal recessive inheritance pattern, which means:

Individuals with one mutated copy (heterozygous carriers) are typically asymptomatic and do not show clinical features of the disease.

When both parents are carriers, their children have:

- 25% (1 in 4) chance of being affected.
- 50% (2 in 4) chance of being asymptomatic carriers.
- 25% (1 in 4) chance of not inheriting the mutation.

== Symptoms ==
Symptoms of COXPD17 include:

- Hypertrophic cardiomyopathy
- Failure to thrive
- Poor growth
- Hypotonia
- Lactic acidosis

== Onset ==
The disorder presents during early infancy, with hypertrophic cardiomyopathy appearing within the first months of life. It may be fatal in early childhood.
