= DNAJC2 =

Protein-coding gene in the species Homo sapiens

Identifiers
- Aliases: DNAJC2, MPHOSPH11, MPP11, ZRF1, ZUO1, DnaJ heat shock protein family (Hsp40) member C2
- External IDs: OMIM: 605502; MGI: 99470; GeneCards: DNAJC2
Available structures
PDB	Ortholog search: PDBe RCSB
PDB	List of PDB id codes 2M2E

Gene location (Human)
Chr.	Chromosome 7 (human)
Band	7q22.1	Start	103,312,289 bp
Band	7q22.1	End	103,344,830 bp

Gene location (Mouse)
Chr.	Chromosome 5 (mouse)
Band	5 A3|5 9.97 cM	Start	21,962,265 bp
Band	5 A3|5 9.97 cM	End	21,990,249 bp
RNA expression pattern
Bgee	Human / Mouse (ortholog); Top expressed in: sural nerve; tendon of biceps brachii; glutes; nasal epithelium; cartilage tissue; hair follicle; gonad; Achilles tendon; sperm; monocyte / Top expressed in: tail of embryo; genital tubercle; seminiferous tubule; epiblast; spermatocyte; spermatid; primitive streak; primary oocyte; migratory enteric neural crest cell; embryo; More reference expression data
BioGPS	n/a
Gene ontology
Molecular function	DNA binding; Hsp70 protein binding; histone binding; chromatin binding; ATPase activator activity; RNA binding; ubiquitin modification-dependent histone binding; protein binding; DNA-binding transcription factor activity, RNA polymerase II-specific
Cellular component	cytoplasm; cytosol; nuclear membrane; nucleus; nucleoplasm
Biological process	positive regulation of transcription, DNA-templated; regulation of cellular response to heat; DNA replication; 'de novo' cotranslational protein folding; regulation of transcription, DNA-templated; negative regulation of DNA biosynthetic process; transcription, DNA-templated; positive regulation of ATP-dependent activity; chromatin organization; regulation of transcription by RNA polymerase II
Sources:Amigo / QuickGO
Orthologs
Databases	NCBI: entry; OMA: entry
Species	Human	Mouse
Entrez	27000	22791
Ensembl	ENSG00000105821	ENSMUSG00000029014
UniProt	Q99543	P54103
RefSeq (mRNA)	NM_001129887; NM_014377; NM_001362667; NM_001362668	NM_009584
RefSeq (protein)	NP_001123359; NP_055192; NP_001349596; NP_001349597	NP_033610
Location (UCSC)	Chr 7: 103.31 – 103.34 Mb	Chr 5: 21.96 – 21.99 Mb
PubMed search
- Wikidata
View/Edit Human	View/Edit Mouse

DnaJ homolog subfamily C member 2 is a protein that in humans is encoded by the DNAJC2 gene.

This gene is a member of the M-phase phosphoprotein (MPP) family. The gene encodes a phosphoprotein with a J domain and a Myb DNA-binding domain which localizes to both the nucleus and the cytosol. The protein is capable of forming a heterodimeric complex that associates with ribosomes, acting as a molecular chaperone for nascent polypeptide chains as they exit the ribosome. This protein was identified as a leukemia-associated antigen and expression of the gene is upregulated in leukemic blasts. Also, chromosomal aberrations involving this gene are associated with primary head and neck squamous cell tumors. This gene has a pseudogene on chromosome 6. Alternatively spliced variants which encode different protein isoforms have been described; however, not all variants have been fully characterized.
