= MMCT =

MMCT may refer to:

- Microcell-Mediated Chromosome Transfer
- Middle Miocene Climate Transition
- Mulanje Mountain Conservation Trust
- Mumbai Central railway station (station code: MMCT), Mumbai, India
- Chichen Itza International Airport (ICAO airport code MMCT)
