= LIME1 =

Protein-coding gene in the species Homo sapiens

Identifiers
- Aliases: LIME1, LIME, LP8067, dJ583P15.4, Lck interacting transmembrane adaptor 1
- External IDs: OMIM: 609809; MGI: 1919949; HomoloGene: 56785; GeneCards: LIME1; OMA:LIME1 - orthologs

Gene location (Mouse)
Chr.	Chromosome 2 (mouse)
Band	2|2 H4	Start	181,021,871 bp
Band	2|2 H4	End	181,025,421 bp
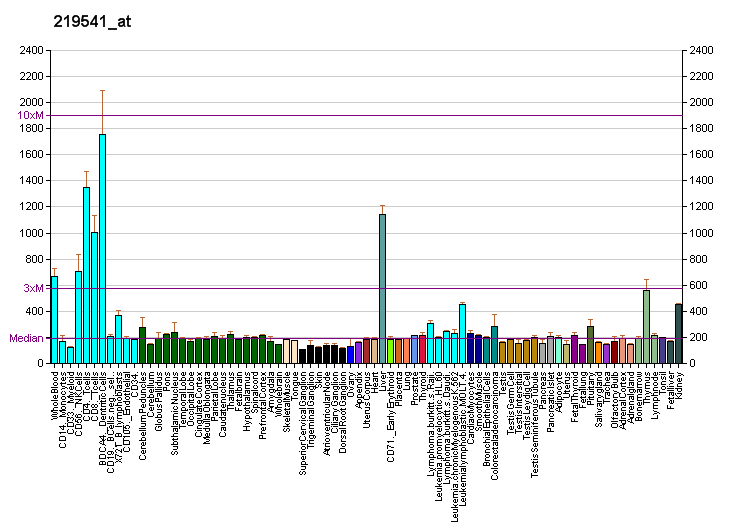
RNA expression pattern
Bgee	Human / Mouse (ortholog); Top expressed in: right lobe of liver; blood; spleen; putamen; bone marrow cells; kidney; caudate nucleus; nucleus accumbens; pituitary gland; hippocampus proper / Top expressed in: granulocyte; islet of Langerhans; spleen; bone marrow; cerebellar cortex; thymus; hypothalamus; striatum of neuraxis; olfactory bulb; superior frontal gyrus; More reference expression data
BioGPS	More reference expression data
Gene ontology
Molecular function	protein kinase binding
Cellular component	integral component of membrane; plasma membrane; membrane; extracellular space; U2-type post-mRNA release spliceosomal complex; B cell receptor complex
Biological process	B cell receptor signaling pathway; T cell receptor signaling pathway; adaptive immune response; immune system process; spliceosomal complex disassembly; regulation of transcription by RNA polymerase II; regulation of phosphatidylinositol 3-kinase signaling; regulation of I-kappaB kinase/NF-kappaB signaling; regulation of MAP kinase activity; regulation of release of sequestered calcium ion into cytosol; regulation of NIK/NF-kappaB signaling
Sources:Amigo / QuickGO
Orthologs
Species	Human	Mouse
Entrez	54923	72699
Ensembl	n/a	ENSMUSG00000090077
UniProt	Q9H400	Q9EQR5
RefSeq (mRNA)	NM_017806; NM_001305654; NM_001305655	NM_023684
RefSeq (protein)	NP_001292583; NP_001292584; NP_060276	NP_076173
Location (UCSC)	n/a	Chr 2: 181.02 – 181.03 Mb
PubMed search
- Wikidata
View/Edit Human	View/Edit Mouse

Lck-interacting transmembrane adapter 1 is a protein that in humans is encoded by the LIME1 gene.

LIME1 is a raft-associated transmembrane adaptor phosphoprotein that is preferentially expressed in hemopoietic cells, particularly T cells.
