= HTATIP2 =

Protein-coding gene in the species Homo sapiens

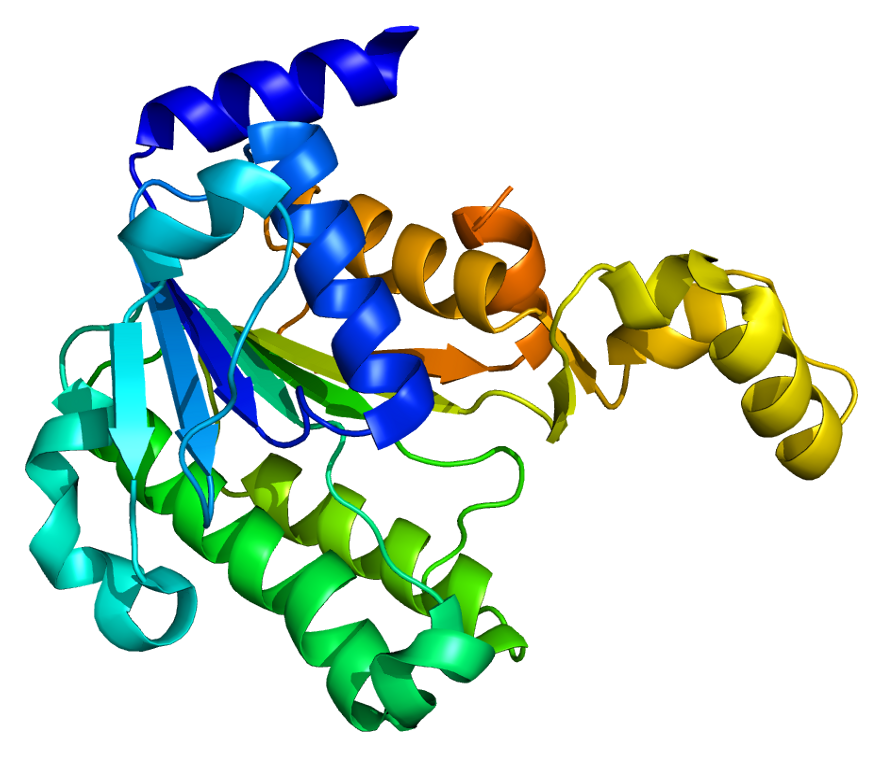

Identifiers
- Aliases: HTATIP2, CC3, SDR44U1, TIP30, HIV-1 Tat interactive protein 2
- External IDs: OMIM: 605628; MGI: 1859271; GeneCards: HTATIP2
Available structures
PDB	Ortholog search: PDBe RCSB
PDB	List of PDB id codes 2BKA

Gene location (Human)
Chr.	Chromosome 11 (human)
Band	11p15.1	Start	20,363,685 bp
Band	11p15.1	End	20,383,782 bp

Gene location (Mouse)
Chr.	Chromosome 7 (mouse)
Band	7|7 B4	Start	49,408,863 bp
Band	7|7 B4	End	49,423,723 bp
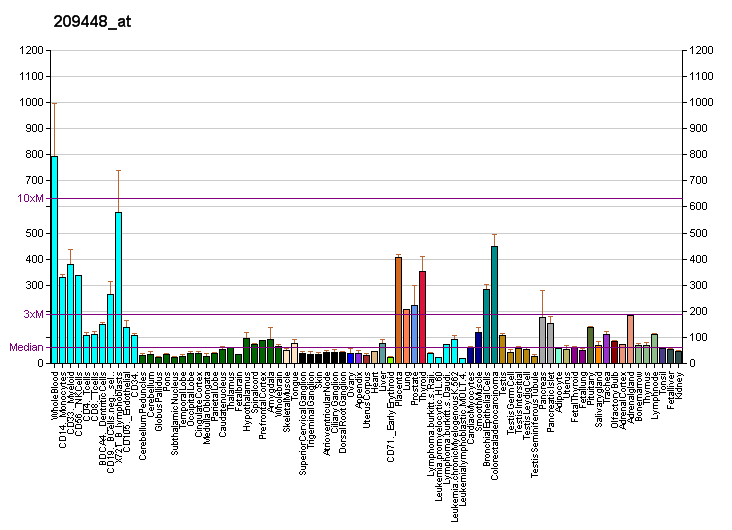

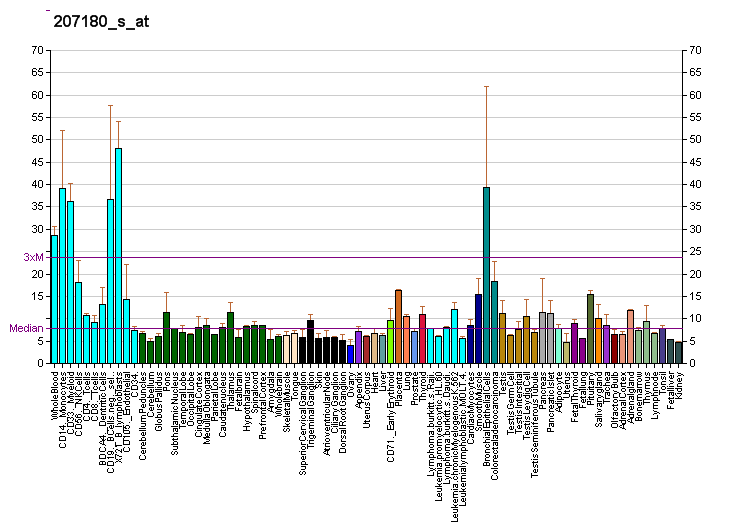
RNA expression pattern
Bgee	Human / Mouse (ortholog); Top expressed in: jejunal mucosa; mucosa of colon; duodenum; mucosa of sigmoid colon; islet of Langerhans; sperm; mucosa of transverse colon; rectum; monocyte; epithelium of nasopharynx / Top expressed in: transitional epithelium of urinary bladder; stroma of bone marrow; epithelium of stomach; duodenum; lumbar spinal ganglion; left lobe of liver; pyloric antrum; mucous cell of stomach; seminal vesicula; decidua; More reference expression data
BioGPS	More reference expression data
Gene ontology
Molecular function	oxidoreductase activity; transcription coactivator activity; protein binding
Cellular component	cytoplasm; nuclear envelope; membrane; nucleus; cytosol
Biological process	multicellular organism development; regulation of transcription by RNA polymerase II; cell differentiation; viral process; negative regulation of apoptotic process; regulation of angiogenesis; angiogenesis; import into nucleus; apoptotic process; positive regulation of nucleic acid-templated transcription
Sources:Amigo / QuickGO
Orthologs
Databases	NCBI: entry; OMA: entry
Species	Human	Mouse
Entrez	10553	53415
Ensembl	ENSG00000109854	ENSMUSG00000039745
UniProt	Q9BUP3	Q9Z2G9
RefSeq (mRNA)	NM_006410; NM_001098520; NM_001098521; NM_001098522; NM_001098523	NM_001146049; NM_001146050; NM_001146052; NM_001146053; NM_016865
RefSeq (protein)	NP_001091990; NP_001091991; NP_001091992; NP_001091993; NP_006401	NP_001139521; NP_001139522; NP_001139524; NP_001139525; NP_058561
Location (UCSC)	Chr 11: 20.36 – 20.38 Mb	Chr 7: 49.41 – 49.42 Mb
PubMed search
- Wikidata
View/Edit Human	View/Edit Mouse

Oxidoreductase HTATIP2 is an enzyme that in humans is encoded by the HTATIP2 gene. It may be a metastasis suppressor.
