= BRMS1 =

Protein-coding gene in the species Homo sapiens

Identifiers
- Aliases: BRMS1, breast cancer metastasis suppressor 1, transcriptional repressor and anoikis regulator, BRMS1 transcriptional repressor and anoikis regulator
- External IDs: OMIM: 606259; MGI: 2388804; GeneCards: BRMS1
Available structures
PDB	Ortholog search: PDBe RCSB
PDB	List of PDB id codes 2XUS, 4AUV

Gene location (Human)
Chr.	Chromosome 11 (human)
Band	11q13.2	Start	66,337,333 bp
Band	11q13.2	End	66,345,125 bp

Gene location (Mouse)
Chr.	Chromosome 19 (mouse)
Band	19|19 A	Start	5,091,382 bp
Band	19|19 A	End	5,099,945 bp
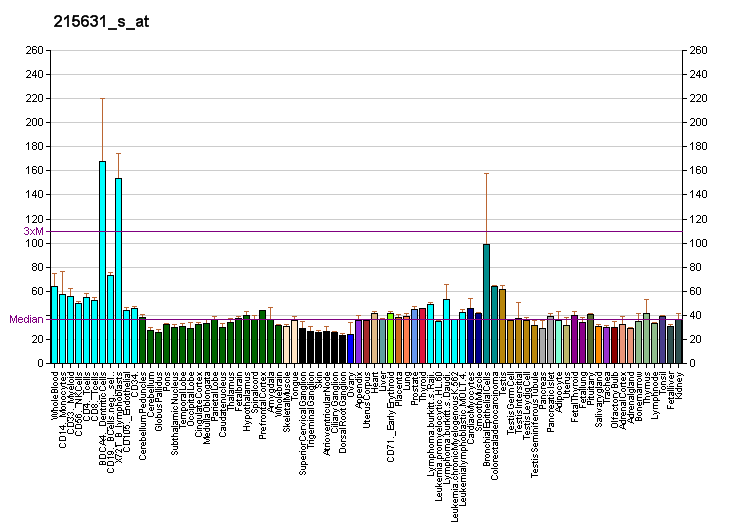
RNA expression pattern
Bgee	Human / Mouse (ortholog); Top expressed in: granulocyte; mucosa of transverse colon; monocyte; skin of leg; skin of abdomen; body of stomach; body of pancreas; sural nerve; minor salivary glands; mucosa of esophagus / Top expressed in: spermatid; blastocyst; yolk sac; morula; lip; right kidney; granulocyte; embryo; embryo; neural layer of retina; More reference expression data
BioGPS	More reference expression data
Gene ontology
Molecular function	histone deacetylase binding; protein binding; NF-kappaB binding; histone deacetylase activity
Cellular component	cytoplasm; Sin3-type complex; nucleus; nucleoplasm
Biological process	positive regulation of protein deacetylation; positive regulation of anoikis; negative regulation of transcription, DNA-templated; negative regulation of NF-kappaB transcription factor activity; negative regulation of transcription by RNA polymerase II; histone deacetylation; regulation of transcription, DNA-templated; transcription, DNA-templated; apoptotic process; regulation of apoptotic process
Sources:Amigo / QuickGO
Orthologs
Databases	NCBI: entry; OMA: entry
Species	Human	Mouse
Entrez	25855	107392
Ensembl	ENSG00000174744	ENSMUSG00000080268
UniProt	Q9HCU9	Q99N20
RefSeq (mRNA)	NM_015399; NM_001024957; NM_001024958	NM_134155; NM_001374047; NM_001374048
RefSeq (protein)	NP_001020128; NP_056214	NP_598916; NP_001360976; NP_001360977
Location (UCSC)	Chr 11: 66.34 – 66.35 Mb	Chr 19: 5.09 – 5.1 Mb
PubMed search
- Wikidata
View/Edit Human	View/Edit Mouse

Breast cancer metastasis suppressor 1 is a protein that in humans is encoded by the BRMS1 gene.

This gene reduces the metastatic potential, but not the tumorogenicity, of human breast cancer and melanoma cell lines. The protein encoded by this gene localizes primarily to the nucleus, and is a component of the mSin3a family of histone deacetylase complexes (HDAC). The protein contains two coiled-coil motifs and several imperfect leucine zipper motifs. Alternative splicing results in two transcript variants encoding different isoforms.
