= NOS1 =

Protein-coding gene in the species Homo sapiens

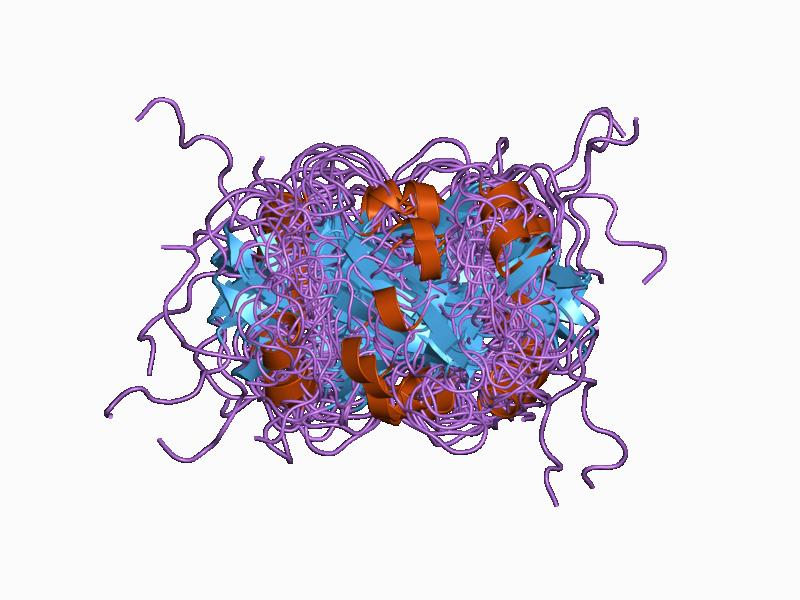

Identifiers
- Aliases: NOS1, IHPS1, N-NOS, NC-NOS, NOS, bNOS, nNOS, nitric oxide synthase 1
- External IDs: OMIM: 163731; MGI: 97360; GeneCards: NOS1
Available structures
PDB	Ortholog search: PDBe RCSB
PDB	List of PDB id codes 4D1N, 4UCH, 4UH5, 4UH6, 4V3U, 5ADF, 5ADG, 5ADI, 5FVX, 5FVW, 5FVU, 5FVV
Enzyme activity
EC #	BRENDA	ExPASy	KEGG	MetaCyc
1.14.13.39	↗	↗	↗	↗

Gene location (Human)
Chr.	Chromosome 12 (human)
Band	12q24.22	Start	117,208,142 bp
Band	12q24.22	End	117,452,170 bp

Gene location (Mouse)
Chr.	Chromosome 5 (mouse)
Band	5 F|5 57.29 cM	Start	117,919,097 bp
Band	5 F|5 57.29 cM	End	118,096,905 bp
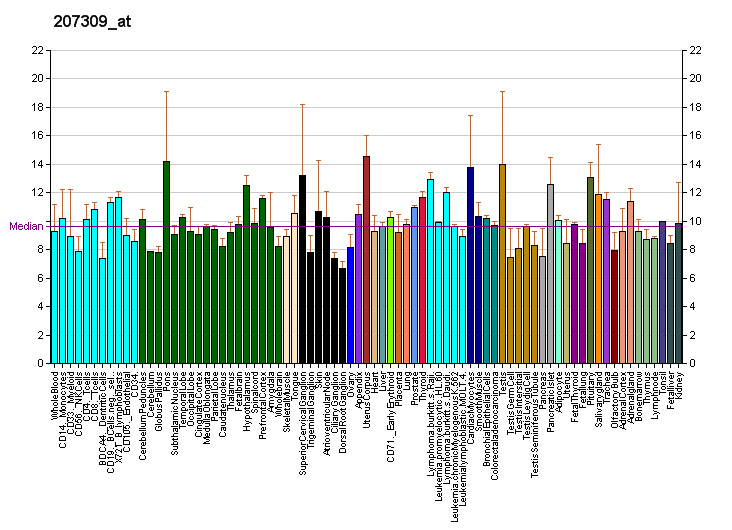

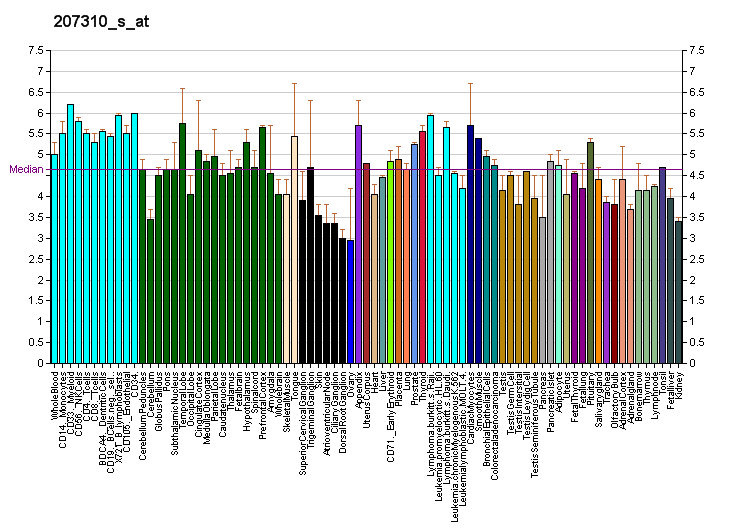
RNA expression pattern
Bgee	Human / Mouse (ortholog); Top expressed in: body of tongue; biceps brachii; Skeletal muscle tissue of biceps brachii; Skeletal muscle tissue of rectus abdominis; muscle of thigh; pons; gastrocnemius muscle; spinal ganglia; buccal mucosa cell; vastus lateralis muscle / Top expressed in: anterior amygdaloid area; pontine nuclei; subiculum; digastric muscle; temporal muscle; mammillary body; dorsal tegmental nucleus; ventromedial nucleus; lateral hypothalamus; sternocleidomastoid muscle; More reference expression data
BioGPS	More reference expression data
Gene ontology
Molecular function	transmembrane transporter binding; tetrahydrobiopterin binding; NADP binding; cadmium ion binding; FMN binding; metal ion binding; heme binding; oxidoreductase activity; scaffold protein binding; calmodulin binding; protein binding; sodium channel regulator activity; flavin adenine dinucleotide binding; arginine binding; nitric-oxide synthase activity; NADPH-hemoprotein reductase activity
Cellular component	membrane; photoreceptor inner segment; T-tubule; synapse; ryanodine receptor complex; mitochondrion; perinuclear region of cytoplasm; caveola; cytoskeleton; cell projection; dendritic spine; Z discdkac; sarcoplasmic reticulum membrane; membrane raft; sarcoplasmic reticulum; sarcolemma; cytosol; cytoplasm; nucleoplasm; plasma membrane; protein-containing complex; calyx of Held; nucleus; vesicle membrane; postsynaptic density
Biological process	multicellular organismal response to stress; positive regulation of guanylate cyclase activity; regulation of sodium ion transport; positive regulation of the force of heart contraction; negative regulation of hydrolase activity; striated muscle contraction; regulation of neurogenesis; negative regulation of serotonin uptake; positive regulation of transcription, DNA-templated; peptidyl-cysteine S-nitrosylation; cell redox homeostasis; arginine catabolic process; negative regulation of potassium ion transport; nitric oxide mediated signal transduction; negative regulation of calcium ion transport into cytosol; myoblast fusion; regulation of calcium ion transmembrane transport via high voltage-gated calcium channel; regulation of ryanodine-sensitive calcium-release channel activity; regulation of cardiac conduction; nitric oxide biosynthetic process; positive regulation of sodium ion transmembrane transport; cellular response to growth factor stimulus; neurotransmitter biosynthetic process; positive regulation of histone acetylation; negative regulation of calcium ion transport; regulation of cardiac muscle contraction; positive regulation of transcription by RNA polymerase II; response to hypoxia; response to heat; negative regulation of blood pressure; retrograde trans-synaptic signaling by nitric oxide; vasodilation; positive regulation of adenylate cyclase-activating adrenergic receptor signaling pathway involved in heart process; synaptic signaling by nitric oxide; response to hormone; response to lipopolysaccharide; positive regulation of peptidyl-serine phosphorylation
Sources:Amigo / QuickGO
Orthologs
Databases	NCBI: entry; OMA: entry
Species	Human	Mouse
Entrez	4842	18125
Ensembl	ENSG00000089250	ENSMUSG00000029361
UniProt	P29475	Q9Z0J4
RefSeq (mRNA)	NM_000620; NM_001204213; NM_001204214; NM_001204218	NM_008712
RefSeq (protein)	NP_000611; NP_001191142; NP_001191143; NP_001191147	NP_032738
Location (UCSC)	Chr 12: 117.21 – 117.45 Mb	Chr 5: 117.92 – 118.1 Mb
PubMed search
- Wikidata
View/Edit Human	View/Edit Mouse

Nitric oxide synthase 1 (neuronal), also known as NOS1, is an enzyme that in humans is encoded by the NOS1 gene.

== Function ==
Nitric oxide synthases (EC 1.14.13.39) (NOSs) are a family of synthases that catalyze the production of nitric oxide (NO) from L-arginine. NO is a chemical messenger with diverse functions throughout the body depending on its enzymatic source and tissue localization. In the brain and peripheral nervous system, where NOS1 is largely present, NO displays many properties of a neurotransmitter and may be involved in long term potentiation. It is implicated in neurotoxicity associated with stroke and neurodegenerative diseases, neural regulation of smooth muscle, including peristalsis and sphincter relaxation, and penile erection. NO is also responsible for endothelium-derived relaxing factor activity regulating blood pressure as produced from its related enzyme NOS3. In macrophages, NO mediates tumoricidal and bactericidal actions, as produced from its related enzyme NOS2. Various pharmacological inhibitors of NO synthases (NOS) block these effects, but further distinction of their function has been elucidated by animal models in which these specific genes have been inactivated. Neuronal NOS (NOS1), Endothelial NOS (NOS3), and Inducible NOS macrophage NOS are distinct isoforms. Both the neuronal and the macrophage forms are unusual among oxidative enzymes in requiring several electron donors: flavin adenine dinucleotide (FAD), flavin mononucleotide (FMN), NADPH, and tetrahydrobiopterin.

== Clinical significance ==
It has been implicated in asthma, schizophrenia, restless leg syndrome, and psychostimulant neurotoxicity. It has also been investigated with respect to bipolar disorder and air pollution exposure.

== Interactions ==
NOS1 has been shown to interact with DLG4 and NOS1AP.

== See also ==
- Nitric oxide synthase
