= MED23 =

Protein-coding gene in the species Homo sapiens

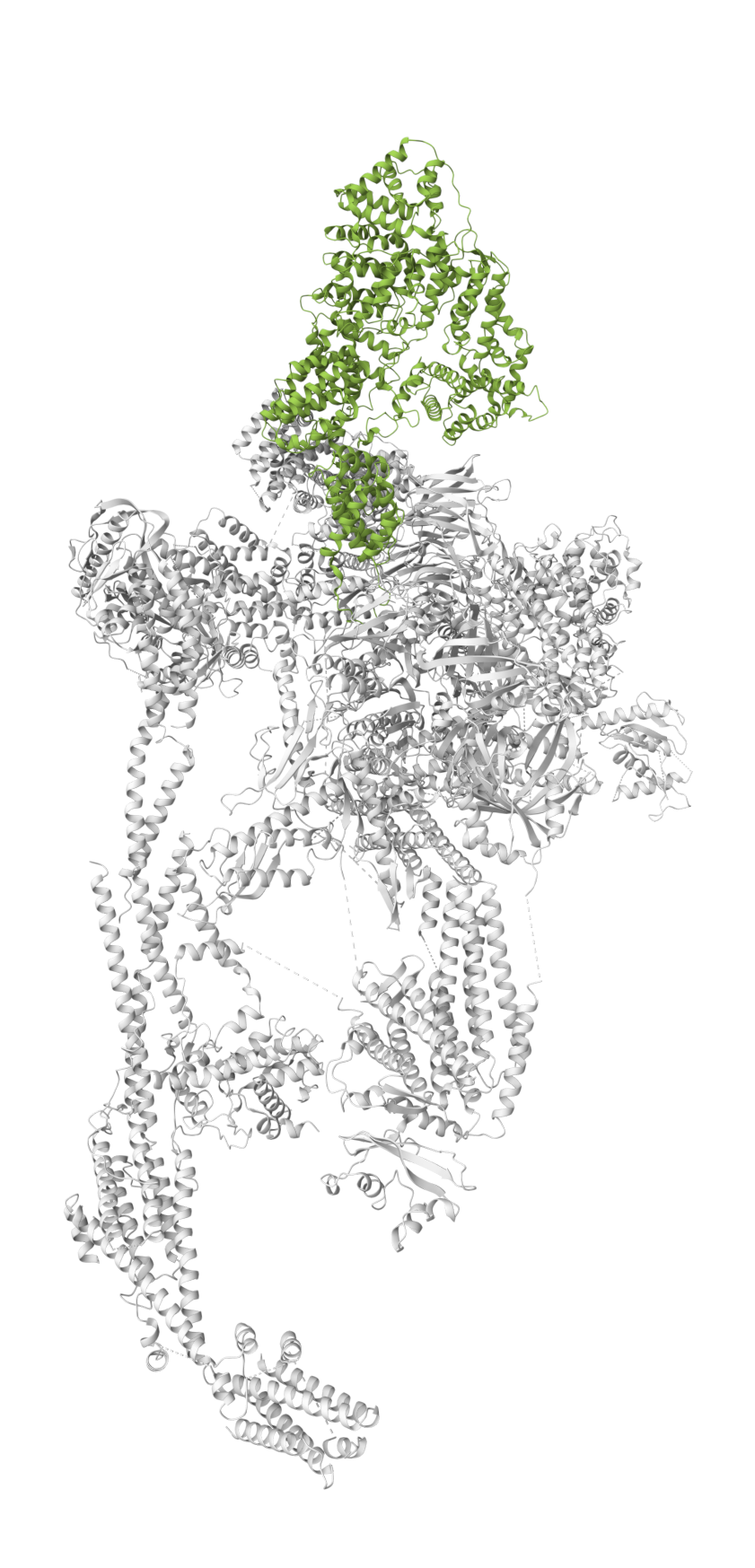

Identifiers
- Aliases: MED23, ARC130, CRSP130, CRSP133, CRSP3, DRIP130, MRT18, SUR-2, SUR2, mediator complex subunit 23
- External IDs: OMIM: 605042; MGI: 1917458; GeneCards: MED23

Gene location (Human)
Chr.	Chromosome 6 (human)
Band	6q23.2	Start	131,573,966 bp
Band	6q23.2	End	131,628,242 bp

Gene location (Mouse)
Chr.	Chromosome 10 (mouse)
Band	10 A4|10	Start	24,745,884 bp
Band	10 A4|10	End	24,789,579 bp
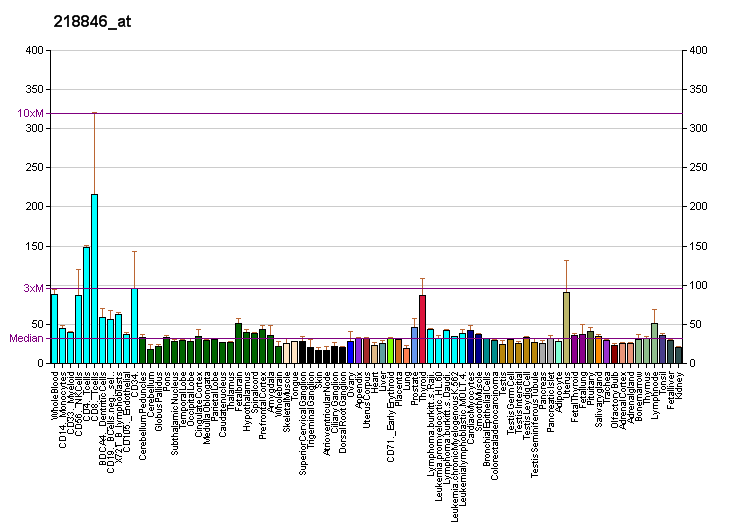
RNA expression pattern
Bgee	Human / Mouse (ortholog); Top expressed in: right hemisphere of cerebellum; Achilles tendon; Epithelium of choroid plexus; endometrium; body of pancreas; mucosa of paranasal sinus; mucosa of sigmoid colon; secondary oocyte; pylorus; epithelium of colon / Top expressed in: spermatocyte; primitive streak; secondary oocyte; zygote; genital tubercle; tail of embryo; Gonadal ridge; primary oocyte; ventricular zone; ganglionic eminence; More reference expression data
BioGPS	More reference expression data
Gene ontology
Molecular function	transcription coactivator activity; protein binding
Cellular component	nucleus; transcription regulator complex; nucleoplasm; mediator complex
Biological process	regulation of transcription by RNA polymerase II; transcription initiation from RNA polymerase II promoter; regulation of transcription, DNA-templated; transcription, DNA-templated; positive regulation of nucleic acid-templated transcription; positive regulation of gene expression
Sources:Amigo / QuickGO
Orthologs
Databases	NCBI: entry; OMA: entry
Species	Human	Mouse
Entrez	9439	70208
Ensembl	ENSG00000112282	ENSMUSG00000019984
UniProt	Q9ULK4	Q80YQ2
RefSeq (mRNA)	NM_001270521; NM_001270522; NM_004830; NM_015979	NM_001166416; NM_027347
RefSeq (protein)	NP_001257450; NP_001257451; NP_004821; NP_057063; NP_001363446 NP_001363447; NP_001363448; NP_001363449; NP_001363450; NP_001363451; NP_001363452; NP_001363453	NP_001159888; NP_081623
Location (UCSC)	Chr 6: 131.57 – 131.63 Mb	Chr 10: 24.75 – 24.79 Mb
PubMed search
- Wikidata
View/Edit Human	View/Edit Mouse

Mediator of RNA polymerase II transcription subunit 23 is an enzyme that in humans is encoded by the MED23 gene.

== Function ==
The activation of gene transcription is a multistep process that is triggered by factors that recognize transcriptional enhancer sites in DNA. These factors work with co-activators to direct transcriptional initiation by the RNA polymerase II apparatus. The protein encoded by this gene is a subunit of the CRSP (cofactor required for SP1 activation) complex, which, along with TFIID, is required for efficient activation by SP1. This protein is also a component of other multisubunit complexes e.g. thyroid hormone receptor-(TR-) associated proteins which interact with TR and facilitate TR function on DNA templates in conjunction with initiation factors and cofactors. This protein also acts as a metastasis suppressor. Two alternatively spliced transcript variants encoding different isoforms have been described for this gene.

== Interactions ==
MED23 has been shown to interact with estrogen receptor alpha, CEBPB, and cyclin-dependent kinase 8.
