= Uroplakin-3a =

Protein-coding gene in the species Homo sapiens

UPK3A

Identifiers
- Aliases: UPK3A, UP3A, UPIII, UPIIIA, UPK3, uroplakin 3A
- External IDs: OMIM: 611559; MGI: 98914; HomoloGene: 5066; GeneCards: UPK3A; OMA:UPK3A - orthologs

Gene location (Human)
Chr.	Chromosome 22 (human)
Band	22q13.31	Start	45,284,949 bp
Band	22q13.31	End	45,295,874 bp

Gene location (Mouse)
Chr.	Chromosome 15 (mouse)
Band	15|15 E2	Start	84,901,342 bp
Band	15|15 E2	End	84,906,748 bp
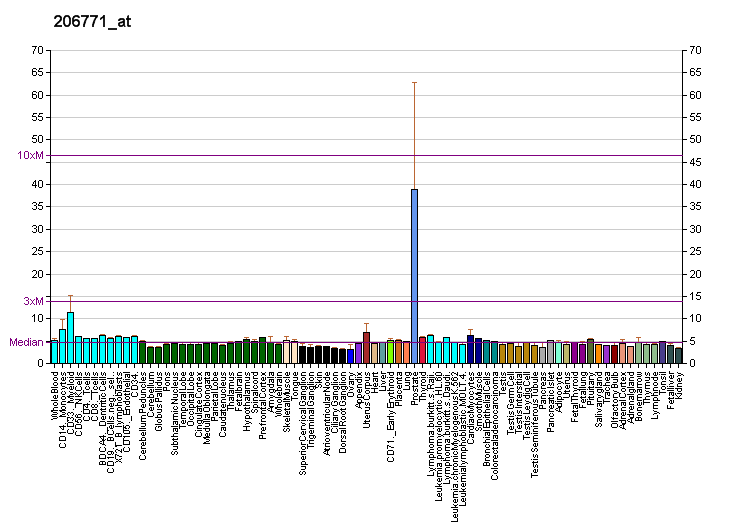
RNA expression pattern
Bgee	Human / Mouse (ortholog); Top expressed in: gastrocnemius muscle; mucosa of urinary bladder; monocyte; prostate; muscle of thigh; granulocyte; muscle of arm; biceps brachii; skeletal muscle tissue; deltoid muscle / Top expressed in: transitional epithelium of urinary bladder; Transitional epithelium of renal pelvis; transitional epithelium of ureter; medullary collecting duct; male urethra; epithelium of male urethra; right kidney; epithelium of female urethra; morula; embryo; More reference expression data
BioGPS	More reference expression data
Gene ontology
Molecular function	protein binding
Cellular component	extracellular exosome; endoplasmic reticulum membrane; apical plasma membrane; membrane; integral component of membrane; endoplasmic reticulum; apical plasma membrane urothelial plaque
Biological process	kidney development; urea transport; epithelial cell differentiation; sodium ion homeostasis; potassium ion homeostasis; urinary bladder development; cell morphogenesis; water transport
Sources:Amigo / QuickGO
Orthologs
Species	Human	Mouse
Entrez	7380	22270
Ensembl	ENSG00000100373	ENSMUSG00000022435
UniProt	O75631	Q9JKX8
RefSeq (mRNA)	NM_001167574; NM_006953	NM_023478
RefSeq (protein)	NP_001161046; NP_008884	NP_075967
Location (UCSC)	Chr 22: 45.28 – 45.3 Mb	Chr 15: 84.9 – 84.91 Mb
PubMed search
- Wikidata
View/Edit Human	View/Edit Mouse

Uroplakin-3a (UP3a) is a protein that in humans is encoded by the UPK3A gene.

The protein is found in the urinary bladder and contributes to the distensibility of this organ. It is also found in the renal pelvis, ureter, and prostatic urethra.
