= SYN3 =

Protein-coding gene in the species Homo sapiens

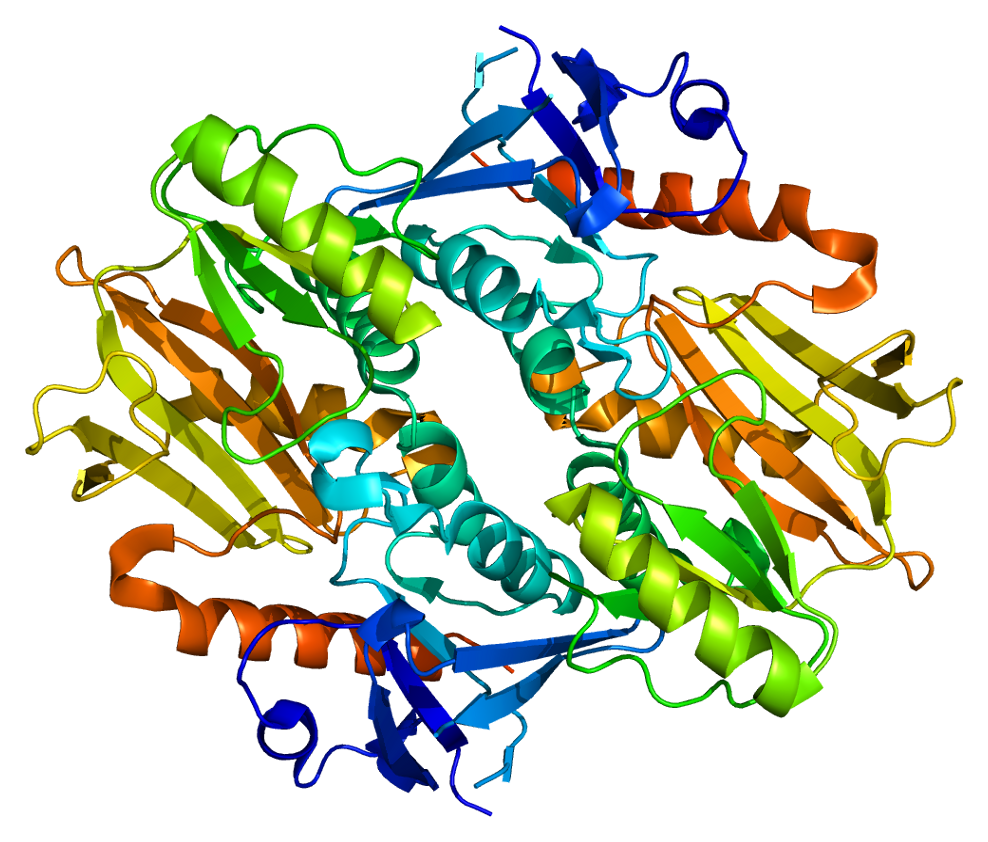

Identifiers
- Aliases: SYN3, synapsin III
- External IDs: OMIM: 602705; MGI: 1351334; GeneCards: SYN3
Available structures
PDB	Ortholog search: PDBe RCSB
PDB	List of PDB id codes 2P0A

Gene location (Human)
Chr.	Chromosome 22 (human)
Band	22q12.3	Start	32,507,820 bp
Band	22q12.3	End	33,058,381 bp

Gene location (Mouse)
Chr.	Chromosome 10 (mouse)
Band	10|10 C1	Start	86,055,125 bp
Band	10|10 C1	End	86,498,896 bp
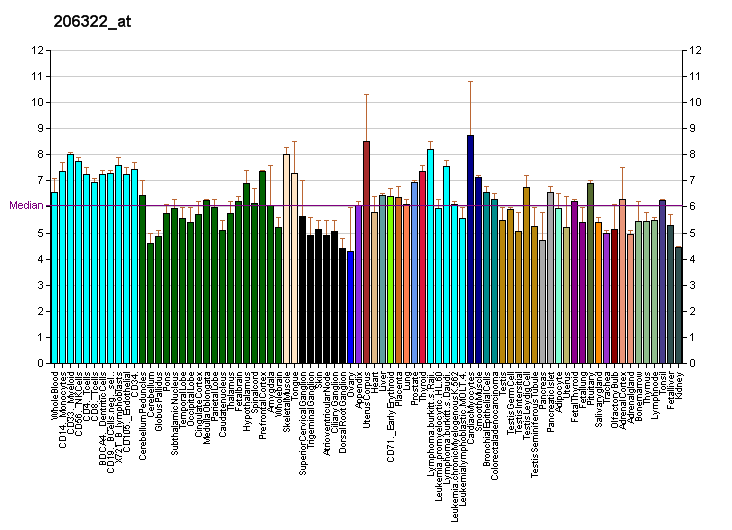
RNA expression pattern
Bgee	Human / Mouse (ortholog); Top expressed in: gonad; primary visual cortex; testicle; prefrontal cortex; right testis; Brodmann area 23; left testis; postcentral gyrus; right frontal lobe; dorsolateral prefrontal cortex / Top expressed in: superior frontal gyrus; primary visual cortex; right kidney; neuron; dentate gyrus of hippocampal formation granule cell; proximal tubule; genital tubercle; tail of embryo; neural layer of retina; neural tube; More reference expression data
BioGPS	More reference expression data
Gene ontology
Molecular function	nucleotide binding; ATP binding
Cellular component	cell junction; synapse; synaptic vesicle membrane; membrane; cytoplasmic vesicle; synaptic vesicle; postsynaptic density; glutamatergic synapse
Biological process	regulation of synaptic transmission, GABAergic; neurotransmitter secretion; synaptic vesicle clustering; synaptic vesicle cycle
Sources:Amigo / QuickGO
Orthologs
Databases	NCBI: entry; OMA: entry
Species	Human	Mouse
Entrez	8224	27204
Ensembl	ENSG00000185666	ENSMUSG00000059602
UniProt	O14994	Q8JZP2
RefSeq (mRNA)	NM_001135774; NM_003490; NM_133632; NM_133633; NM_001369907 NM_001369908; NM_001369909; NM_001369910	NM_001164495; NM_013722
RefSeq (protein)	NP_001129246; NP_003481; NP_598344; NP_001356836; NP_001356837 NP_001356838; NP_001356839	NP_001157967; NP_038750
Location (UCSC)	Chr 22: 32.51 – 33.06 Mb	Chr 10: 86.06 – 86.5 Mb
PubMed search
- Wikidata
View/Edit Human	View/Edit Mouse

Synapsin-3 is a protein that in humans is encoded by the SYN3 gene.

This gene is a member of the synapsin gene family. Synapsins encode neuronal phosphoproteins which associate with the cytoplasmic surface of synaptic vesicles. Family members are characterized by common protein domains, and they are implicated in synaptogenesis and the modulation of neurotransmitter release, suggesting a potential role in several neuropsychiatric diseases. The protein encoded by this gene shares the synapsin family domain model, with domains A, C, and E exhibiting the highest degree of conservation. The protein contains a unique domain J, located between domains C and E. Based on this gene's localization to 22q12.3, a possible schizophrenia susceptibility locus, and the established neurobiological roles of the synapsins, this family member may represent a candidate gene for schizophrenia. The TIMP3 gene is located within an intron of this gene and is transcribed in the opposite direction. Alternative splicing of this gene results in six transcript variants; however, only two variants have been fully described.
