= RASD1 =

Protein-coding gene in the species Homo sapiens

Identifiers
- Aliases: RASD1, AGS1, DEXRAS1, MGC:26290, ras related dexamethasone induced 1
- External IDs: OMIM: 605550; MGI: 1270848; HomoloGene: 7509; GeneCards: RASD1; OMA:RASD1 - orthologs

Gene location (Human)
Chr.	Chromosome 17 (human)
Band	17p11.2	Start	17,494,437 bp
Band	17p11.2	End	17,496,395 bp

Gene location (Mouse)
Chr.	Chromosome 11 (mouse)
Band	11|11 B1.3	Start	59,854,007 bp
Band	11|11 B1.3	End	59,855,770 bp
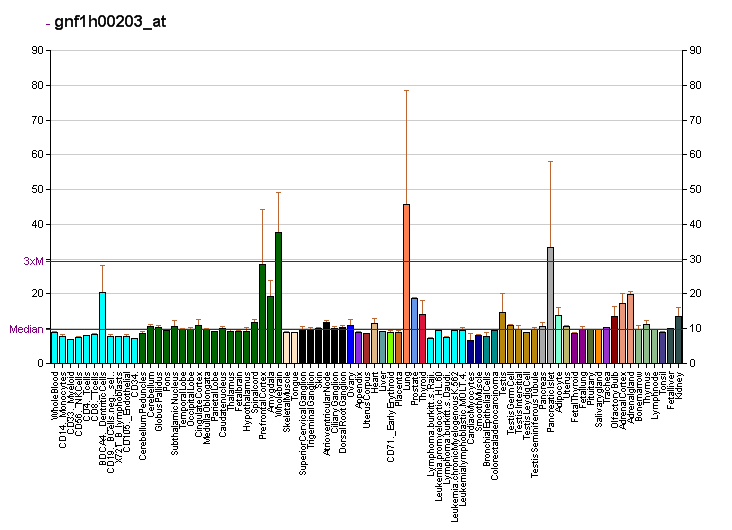
RNA expression pattern
Bgee	Human / Mouse (ortholog); Top expressed in: pericardium; renal medulla; anterior pituitary; middle temporal gyrus; pancreatic ductal cell; trachea; parotid gland; Brodmann area 23; right lobe of thyroid gland; cardiac muscle tissue of right atrium / Top expressed in: brown adipose tissue; islet of Langerhans; suprachiasmatic nucleus; white adipose tissue; subcutaneous adipose tissue; medial dorsal nucleus; lactiferous gland; tunica adventitia of aorta; CA3 field; medial geniculate nucleus; More reference expression data
BioGPS	More reference expression data
Gene ontology
Molecular function	nucleotide binding; GTP binding; protein binding; GTPase activity
Cellular component	cytoplasm; perinuclear region of cytoplasm; plasma membrane; nucleus; sarcoplasmic reticulum; membrane
Biological process	G protein-coupled receptor signaling pathway; negative regulation of transcription, DNA-templated; signal transduction; nitric oxide mediated signal transduction
Sources:Amigo / QuickGO
Orthologs
Species	Human	Mouse
Entrez	51655	19416
Ensembl	ENSG00000108551	ENSMUSG00000049892
UniProt	Q9Y272	O35626
RefSeq (mRNA)	NM_016084; NM_001199989	NM_009026
RefSeq (protein)	NP_001186918; NP_057168	NP_033052
Location (UCSC)	Chr 17: 17.49 – 17.5 Mb	Chr 11: 59.85 – 59.86 Mb
PubMed search
- Wikidata
View/Edit Human	View/Edit Mouse

Dexamethasone-induced Ras-related protein 1 (RASD1) is a protein that in humans is encoded by the RASD1 gene on chromosome 17. It is ubiquitously expressed in many tissues and cell types. As a member of the Ras superfamily of small G-proteins, RASD1 regulates signal transduction pathways through both G proteins and G protein-coupled receptors. RASD1 has been associated with several cancers. The RASD1 gene also contains one of 27 SNPs associated with increased risk of coronary artery disease.

== Structure ==
=== Gene ===
The RASD1 gene resides on chromosome 17 at the band 17p11.2 and contains 2 exons. This gene produces 2 isoforms through alternative splicing. A glucocorticoid response element (GRE) located in the 3'- flanking region of this gene allows glucocorticoids to induce expression of RASD1.

=== Protein ===
This protein is a small GTPase belonging to the Ras superfamily. As a Ras superfamily member, RASD1 shares several motifs characteristic of Ras proteins, including four highly conserved GTP binding pocket domains: the phosphate/magnesium binding regions GXXXXGK(S/T) (domain Σ1), DXXG (domain Σ2), and the guanine base binding loops NKXD (domain Σ3) and EXSAK (domain Σ4). These four domains, along with an effector loop, are responsible for binding to other proteins and signaling molecules. Another common Ras motif, the CAAX motif, can be found in the C-terminal of RASD1 and promotes the subcellular localization of RASD1 to the plasma membrane. As a GTPase, RASD1 also shares motifs, such as in the regions G-1 to G-3, with other GTPases. The full-length RASD1 cDNA produces a protein with a length of 280 amino acid residues and a molecular mass of 31.7 kDa.

== Function ==
RASD1 is expressed in many tissues including brain, heart, liver, and kidney. It is also present in bone marrow, but its expression is absent or at very low levels in spleen, lymph node, and peripheral blood leukocytes. RASD1 modulates multiple signaling cascades. RASD1 could activate G proteins in a receptor-independent manner and inhibit signal transduction through several different G protein-coupled receptors. Although RASD1 is a member of the Ras superfamily of small G-proteins, which often promotes cell growth and tumor expansion, it plays an active role in preventing aberrant cell growth. It can be induced by corticosteroids and may play a role in the negative feedback loop controlling adrenocorticotropic hormone (ACTH) secretion. In the hypothalamus, RASD1 expression is induced in two ways: one by elevated glucocorticoids in response to stress, and one in response to increased plasma osmolality resulting from osmotic stress. Based on its inhibitory actions on CREB phosphorylation, increased RASD1 in vasopressin-expressing neurons may be essential in controlling the transcriptional responses to stressors in both the supraoptic nucleus and paraventricular nucleus via modulation of the cAMP-PKA-CREB signaling pathway. RASD1 is also reported to function with leptin in the activation of TRPC4 transient receptor potential channels and, thus, plays a role in regulating electrical excitability in gastrointestinal myocytes, pancreatic β-cells, and neurons. In addition, the interaction between RASD1 and Ear2 is involved in renin transcriptional regulation.

== Clinical significance ==
In humans, upregulation of RASD1 leading to increased apoptosis has been observed in several human cancer cell lines such as DU-154 human prostate cancer cells and in human breast cancer cells MCF-7. In the latter, high concentrations of calycosin significantly suppressed the proliferation of MCF-7 cells, thereby promoting apoptosis of the cells. Moreover, compared with a control group, the expression of Bcl-2 decreased with calycosin while Bax increased, and these changes correlated with an elevated expression of RASD1. Together, it appears that, at relatively high concentrations, calycosin can trigger the mitochondrial apoptotic pathway by upregulating RASD1.

=== Clinical marker ===
Additionally, in the cardiovascular field, a genome-wide analysis of common variants demonstrated a substantial overlap in the genetic risk of ischemic stroke and coronary artery disease, such as the link between RASD1 and other loci such as RAI1 and PEMT. A multi-locus genetic risk score study based on a combination of 27 loci, including the RASD1 gene, identified individuals at increased risk for both incident and recurrent coronary artery disease events, as well as an enhanced clinical benefit from statin therapy. The study was based on a community cohort study (the Malmo Diet and Cancer study) and four additional randomized controlled trials of primary prevention cohorts (JUPITER and ASCOT) and secondary prevention cohorts (CARE and PROVE IT-TIMI 22).

== Interactions ==
RASD1 has been shown to interact with NOS1AP.
