= Synapsin =

Family of proteins

Synapsin, N-terminal domain
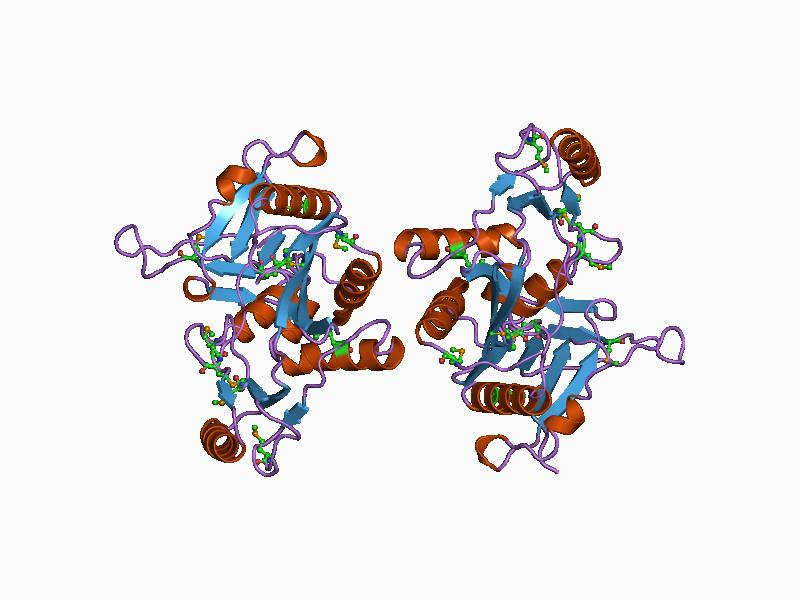
- Structure of the c domain of synapsin IA from bovine brain.

Identifiers
- Symbol: Synapsin
- Pfam: PF02078
- InterPro: IPR001359
- PROSITE: PDOC00345
- SCOP2: 1auv / SCOPe / SUPFAM
- OPM superfamily: 123
- OPM protein: 1auv
- Membranome: 349
Available protein structures:
- PDB: IPR001359 PF02078 (ECOD; PDBsum)
- AlphaFold: IPR001359; PF02078

Synapsin, ATP binding domain

Identifiers
- Symbol: Synapsin_C
- Pfam: PF02750
- InterPro: IPR001359
- PROSITE: PDOC00345
- SCOP2: 1auv / SCOPe / SUPFAM
Available protein structures:
- PDB: 1auv , 1aux , 1i7l , 1i7n , 1pk8 , 1px2 , 2p0a IPR001359 PF02750 (ECOD; PDBsum)
- AlphaFold: IPR001359; PF02750

The synapsins are a family of proteins that have long been implicated in the regulation of neurotransmitter release at chemical synapses. Specifically, they are thought to be involved in regulating the number of synaptic vesicles available for release via exocytosis at any one time. Synapsins are present in invertebrates and vertebrates and are strongly conserved across all species. They are expressed in highest concentration in the nervous system, although they also express in other body systems such as the reproductive organs, including both eggs and spermatozoa. Synapsin function also increases as the organism matures, reaching its peak at sexual maturity.

Current studies suggest the following hypothesis for the role of synapsin: synapsins bind synaptic vesicles to components of the cytoskeleton which prevents them from migrating to the presynaptic membrane and releasing neurotransmitter. During an action potential, synapsins are phosphorylated by PKA (cAMP dependent protein kinase), releasing the synaptic vesicles and allowing them to move to the membrane and release their neurotransmitter.

Gene knockout studies in mice (where the mouse is unable to produce synapsin) have had some surprising results. Consistently, knockout studies have shown that mice lacking one or more synapsins have defects in synaptic transmission induced by high‐frequency stimulation, suggesting that the synapsins may be one of the factors boosting release probability in synapses at high firing rates, such as by aiding the recruitment of vesicles from the reserve pool. Furthermore, mice lacking all three synapsins are prone to seizures, and experience learning defects. These results suggest that while synapsins are not essential for synaptic function, they do serve an important modulatory role. Lastly, observed effects seemed to vary between inhibitory and excitatory synapses, suggesting synapsins may play a slightly different role in each type.

== Family members ==
Humans and most other vertebrates possess three genes encoding three different synapsin proteins. Each gene in turn is alternatively spliced to produce at least two different protein isoforms for a total of six isoforms:

Gene	Protein	Isoforms
SYN1	Synapsin I	Ia, Ib
SYN2	Synapsin II	IIa, IIb
SYN3	Synapsin III	IIIa, IIIb

Different neuron terminals will express varying amounts of each of these synapsin proteins and collectively these synapsins will comprise 1% of the total expressed protein at any one time. Synapsin Ia has been implicated in bipolar disorder and schizophrenia.
