= Caveolae-associated protein 2 =

Protein found in humans

CAVIN2

Identifiers
- Aliases: CAVIN2, PS-p68, SDR, cavin-2, SDPR, serum deprivation response, caveolae associated protein 2
- External IDs: OMIM: 606728; MGI: 99513; GeneCards: CAVIN2

Gene location (Human)
Chr.	Chromosome 2 (human)
Band	2q32.3	Start	191,834,310 bp
Band	2q32.3	End	191,847,088 bp

Gene location (Mouse)
Chr.	Chromosome 1 (mouse)
Band	1|1 C1.1	Start	51,328,285 bp
Band	1|1 C1.1	End	51,342,119 bp
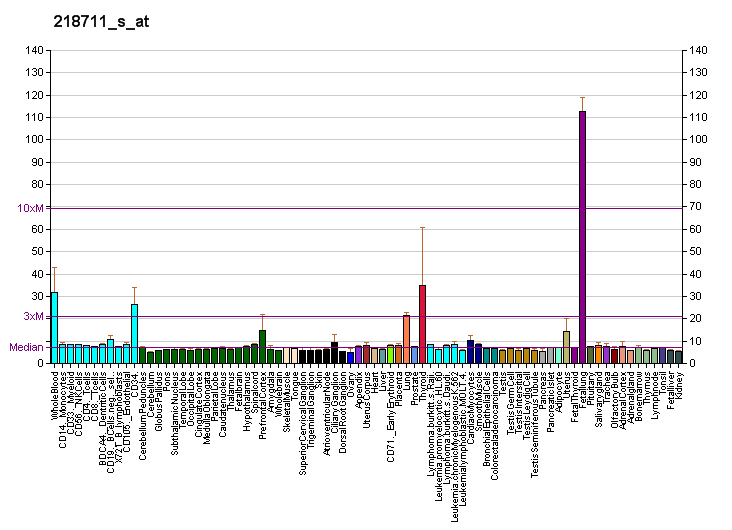
RNA expression pattern
Bgee	Human / Mouse (ortholog); Top expressed in: monocyte; lower lobe of lung; right lung; upper lobe of lung; superficial temporal artery; upper lobe of left lung; parietal pleura; abdominal fat; gallbladder; pericardium / Top expressed in: right lung; right lung lobe; left lung; left lung lobe; vestibular membrane of cochlear duct; atrioventricular valve; atrium; white adipose tissue; tunica adventitia of aorta; carotid body; More reference expression data
BioGPS	More reference expression data
Gene ontology
Molecular function	phosphatidylserine binding; protein binding; phospholipid binding; protein kinase C binding; lipid binding
Cellular component	cytoplasm; membrane raft; cytosol; membrane; caveola; nucleoplasm; plasma membrane; actin cytoskeleton
Biological process	plasma membrane tubulation
Sources:Amigo / QuickGO
Orthologs
Databases	NCBI: entry; OMA: entry
Species	Human	Mouse
Entrez	8436	20324
Ensembl	ENSG00000168497	ENSMUSG00000045954
UniProt	O95810	Q63918
RefSeq (mRNA)	NM_004657	NM_138741
RefSeq (protein)	NP_004648	NP_620080
Location (UCSC)	Chr 2: 191.83 – 191.85 Mb	Chr 1: 51.33 – 51.34 Mb
PubMed search
- Wikidata
View/Edit Human	View/Edit Mouse

Caveolae-associated protein 2 or Cavin-2 is a protein that in humans is encoded by the CAVIN2 gene (previously SDPR). Cavin-2 is highly expressed in a variety of human endothelial cells.

This gene has a calcium-independent phospholipid-binding protein whose expression increases in serum-starved cells. This protein has also been shown to be a substrate for protein kinase C (PKC) phosphorylation.

== Function ==
Cavin-2 is required for blood vessel formation (angiogenesis) in humans and zebrafish and required also for the endothelial cell proliferation, migration and invasion in humans. Cavin-2 plays an important role in endothelial cell maintenance by regulating eNOS activity. Cavin-2 controls the generation of nitric oxide (NO) in human endothelial cells by controlling the activity and stability of the protein endothelial nitric-oxide synthase (eNOS).

== Secretion ==
Cavin-2 is highly secreted from human endothelial cells (HUVEC), they are secreted through endothelial microparticles (EMPs) but not exosomes and is required for EMP biogenesis.

== Clinical significance ==
Cavin-2/SDPR is shown to act as a metastasis suppressor by xenograft studies utilizing breast cancer cell lines. Cavin-2 may elicit its metastasis suppressor function by directly interacting with ERK and limiting its pro-survival role. Moreover, it is suggested that cavin-2 is silenced during breast cancer progression by promoter DNA methylation. Metastasis suppressor role of cavin-2 may go beyond breast cancer since tumor samples from bladder, colorectal, lung, pancreatic, and ovarian cancers as well as sarcomas also exhibited loss of cavin-2 expression.
