= Microcell-mediated chromosome transfer =

Microcell Mediated Chromosome Transfer (or MMCT) is a technique used in cell biology and genetics to transfer a chromosome from a defined donor cell line into a recipient cell line. MMCT has been in use since the 1970s and has contributed to a multitude of discoveries including tumor, metastasis and telomerase suppressor genes as well as information about epigenetics, x-inactivation, mitochondrial function and aneuploidy. MMCT follows the basic procedure where donor cells (i.e. cells providing one or more chromosomes or fragments to a recipient cell) are induced to multinucleate their chromosomes. These nuclei are then forced through the cell membrane to create microcells, which can be fused to a recipient cell line.

== History ==
The term MMCT was first used by Fournier and Ruddle in 1977. Their method was based on previous work from 1974 by Ege, Ringertz, Veomett and colleagues, synthesizing the techniques used at the time to induce multinucleation in cells, nuclear removal and cell-cell fusions. The next major step in MMCT came during the 1980s when new transfection techniques were utilized to introduce selectable markers onto chromosomes thus making it possible to select for the introduction of specific chromosomes and more easily create defined hybrids.

== Procedure ==
Procedures for MMCT differ slightly but they all require: the induction of multinucleation, enucleation (nuclear removal), and fusion. Multinucleation is usually accomplished through causing prolonged mitotic arrest by colcemid treatment. Certain cells will then "slip" out of mitosis and form multiple nuclei. These nuclei can then be removed using cytochalasin B to disrupt the cytoskeleton and centrifugation in a density gradient to force enucleation. The newly created microcells can then be fused to recipient (target) cells by exposure to poly ethylene glycol, use of Sendai virus, or electrofusion.

Variations now allow construction of "humanized" mice with large pieces from human chromosomes as well as new methods for human and mouse artificial chromosomes.
