= ELAC2 =

Protein-coding gene in the species Homo sapiens

Identifiers
- Aliases: ELAC2, COXPD17, ELC2, HPC2, elaC ribonuclease Z 2
- External IDs: OMIM: 605367; MGI: 1890496; GeneCards: ELAC2
Enzyme activity
EC #	BRENDA	ExPASy	KEGG	MetaCyc
3.1.26.11	↗	↗	↗	↗

Gene location (Human)
Chr.	Chromosome 17 (human)
Band	17p12	Start	12,991,612 bp
Band	17p12	End	13,018,065 bp

Gene location (Mouse)
Chr.	Chromosome 11 (mouse)
Band	11 B3|11 40.42 cM	Start	64,869,864 bp
Band	11 B3|11 40.42 cM	End	64,892,895 bp
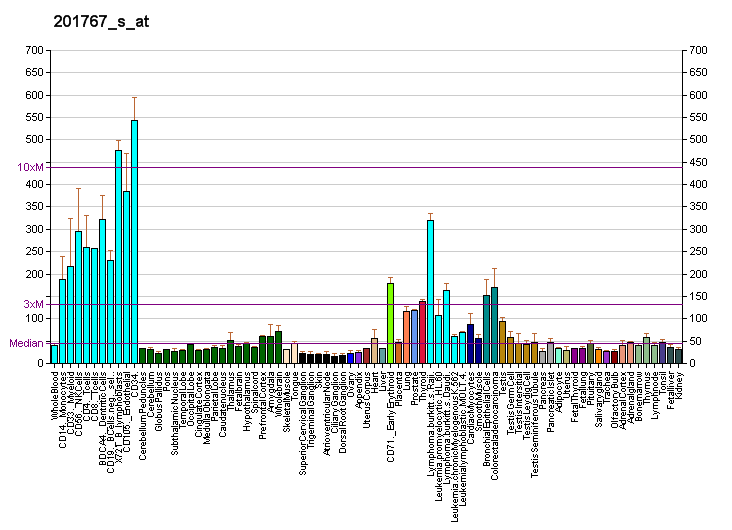
RNA expression pattern
Bgee	Human / Mouse (ortholog); Top expressed in: gastric mucosa; apex of heart; right adrenal cortex; left adrenal gland; sural nerve; left adrenal cortex; gastrocnemius muscle; epithelium of colon; left ventricle; islet of Langerhans / Top expressed in: otic placode; saccule; otic vesicle; perirhinal cortex; entorhinal cortex; spermatocyte; epiblast; zygote; yolk sac; CA3 field; More reference expression data
BioGPS	More reference expression data
Gene ontology
Molecular function	endonuclease activity; nuclease activity; hydrolase activity; metal ion binding; tRNA-specific ribonuclease activity; RNA binding; 3'-tRNA processing endoribonuclease activity
Cellular component	mitochondrial matrix; mitochondrial nucleoid; mitochondrion; nucleus; nucleoplasm
Biological process	mitochondrial tRNA 3'-trailer cleavage, endonucleolytic; mitochondrial tRNA processing; tRNA 3'-end processing; tRNA processing
Sources:Amigo / QuickGO
Orthologs
Databases	NCBI: entry; OMA: entry
Species	Human	Mouse
Entrez	60528	68626
Ensembl	ENSG00000006744	ENSMUSG00000020549
UniProt	Q9BQ52	Q80Y81
RefSeq (mRNA)	NM_173717; NM_001165962; NM_018127	NM_023479; NM_001362982; NM_001362983; NM_001362984
RefSeq (protein)	NP_001159434; NP_060597; NP_776065	NP_075968; NP_001349911; NP_001349912; NP_001349913
Location (UCSC)	Chr 17: 12.99 – 13.02 Mb	Chr 11: 64.87 – 64.89 Mb
PubMed search
- Wikidata
View/Edit Human	View/Edit Mouse

Zinc phosphodiesterase ELAC protein 2 is an enzyme that in humans is encoded by the ELAC2 gene. on chromosome 17. It is an endonuclease thought to be involved in mitochondrial tRNA maturation,

== Function ==
The ELAC2 gene encodes a protein that is 92 kDa in size and is localized to the mitochondrion and the nucleus. The ELAC2 protein is a zinc phosphodiesterase, which is known to show tRNA 3'-processing endonuclease activity inside the mitochondria. Mitochondria contain their own pool of tRNAs that are involved in the protein translation of 13 subunits of the respiratory chain that are encoded by the mitochondrial genome. ELAC2 functions in the maturation of tRNA by removing a 3'-trailer (extra 3' nucleotides) from tRNA precursors, generating 3' termini of tRNAs.

The reaction leaves a 3'-hydroxy group is left at the tRNA end, and a 5'-phosphoryl group at the cleaved, trailing end. The reaction requires zinc ions as co-factors.

== Clinical significance ==
Variants of the ELAC2 gene are associated with prostate cancer, hereditary 2 (HPC2), a condition associated with familial cancer of the prostate. Multiple mutations including truncation and missense mutations are known to cause the disease from multiple families based on linkage analysis and positional cloning.

In addition, mutations in ELAC2 are known to cause combined oxidative phosphorylation deficiency 17 (COXPD17), a rare autosomal recessive disorder of mitochondrial functions characterized by severe hypertrophic cardiomyopathy.
