= Phosphoprotein =

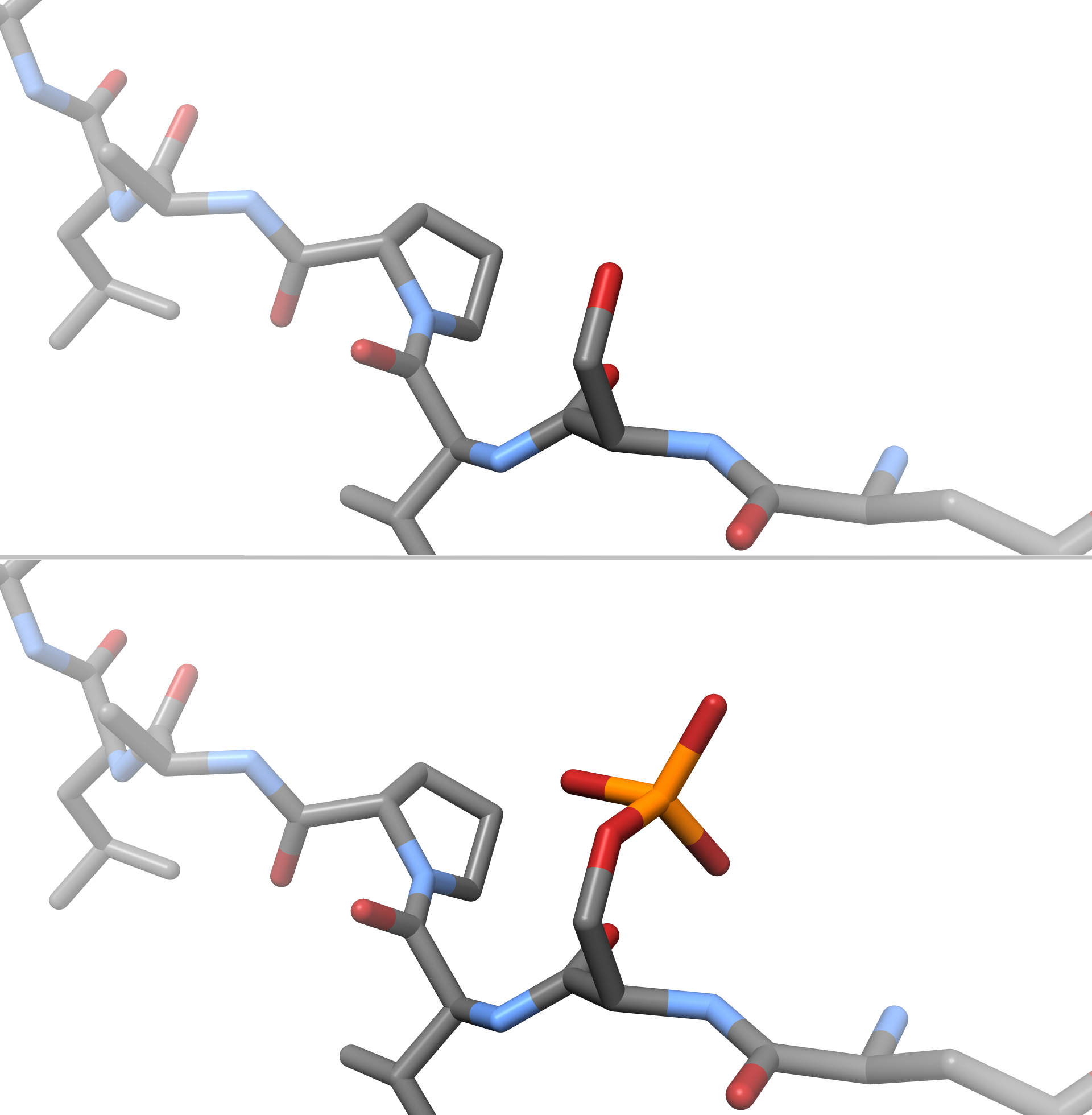
Serine in an amino acid chain, before and after phosphorylation.

A phosphoprotein is a protein that is posttranslationally modified by the attachment of either a single phosphate group, or a complex molecule such as 5'-phospho-DNA, through a phosphate group. The target amino acid is most often serine, threonine, or tyrosine residues (mostly in eukaryotes), or aspartic acid or histidine residues (mostly in prokaryotes).

== Biological function ==
The phosphorylation of proteins is a major regulatory mechanism in cells.

== Clinical significance ==
Phosphoproteins have been proposed as biomarkers for breast cancer.

== See also ==
- Protein phosphorylation
- Phosphoserine
