= SR protein =

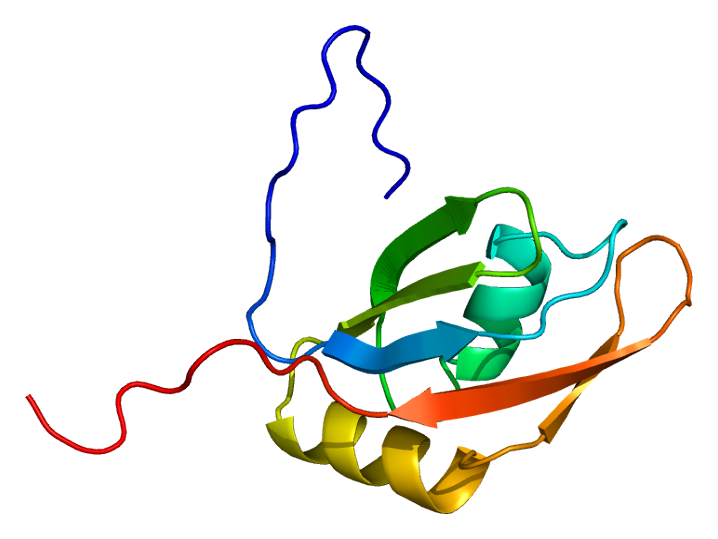
Solution structure of the RRM domain of the mouse SR protein Sfrs9 based on 1wg4.

SR proteins are a conserved family of proteins involved in RNA splicing. SR proteins are named because they contain a protein domain with long repeats of serine and arginine amino acid residues, whose standard abbreviations are "S" and "R" respectively. SR proteins are ~200-600 amino acids in length and composed of two domains, the RNA recognition motif (RRM) region and the RS domain. SR proteins are more commonly found in the nucleus than the cytoplasm, but several SR proteins are known to shuttle between the nucleus and the cytoplasm.

SR proteins were discovered in the 1990s in Northern Ireland, Belfast in amphibian oocytes, and later in humans. In general, metazoans appear to have SR proteins and unicellular organisms lack SR proteins.

SR proteins are important in constitutive and alternative pre-mRNA splicing, mRNA export, genome stabilization, nonsense-mediated decay, and translation. SR proteins alternatively splice pre-mRNA by preferentially selecting different splice sites on the pre-mRNA strands to create multiple mRNA transcripts from one pre-mRNA transcript. Once splicing is complete the SR protein may or may not remain attached to help shuttle the mRNA strand out of the nucleus. As RNA Polymerase II is transcribing DNA into RNA, SR proteins attach to newly made pre-mRNA to prevent the pre-mRNA from binding to the coding DNA strand to increase genome stabilization. Topoisomerase I and SR proteins also interact to increase genome stabilization. SR proteins can control the concentrations of specific mRNA that is successfully translated into protein by selecting for poison exons during alternative splicing. SR proteins can alternatively splice poison exons into their own mRNA transcripts to auto-regulate the concentration of SR proteins. Through the mTOR pathway and interactions with polyribosomes, SR proteins can increase translation of mRNA.

Ataxia telangiectasia, neurofibromatosis type 1, several cancers, HIV-1, and spinal muscular atrophy have all been linked to alternative splicing by SR proteins.

== History ==
SR proteins were discovered independently through the use of two different monoclonal antibodies. The first antibody, mAb104 found SR proteins in the nucleus of amphibian oocytes. The mAb104 antibody binds to a phosphoepitope on the C-terminal domain of SR proteins. mAb104 also binds to active sites of RNA polymerase II transcription. This antibody allowed identification of four SR proteins (SRp20, SRp40, SRp55 and SRp75) and demonstrated their conservation among vertebrates and invertebrates. The second antibody, B52 was used in Drosophila. B52 is closely related to the splicing factor SF2/ASF and bound to both RNA and DNA in Drosophila. The discovery of SR proteins in Drosophila revealed three SR proteins, SWAP (suppressor-of-white-apricot), Tra and Tra-2 (transformer and transformer-2 respectively).

== Examples of genes ==
The following is a list of 14 human genes encoding SR proteins involved in splicing:

Gene	Aliases	Protein	Locus
SRSF1	SFRS1; ASF; SF2; SF2p33; SFRS1; SRp30a	Serine/arginine-rich splicing factor 1	17q22
SRSF2	SFRS2; PR264; SC-35; SC35; SFRS2; SFRS2A; SRp30b	Serine/arginine-rich splicing factor 2	17q25
SRSF3	SFRS3; SRp20	Serine/arginine-rich splicing factor 3	6p21
SRSF4	SFRS4; SRP75	Serine/arginine-rich splicing factor 4	1p35
SRSF5	HRS; SFRS5; SRP40	Serine/arginine-rich splicing factor 5	14q24
SRSF6	B52; SFRS6; SRP55	Serine/arginine-rich splicing factor 6	20q13
SRSF7	9G8; AAG3; SFRS7	Serine/arginine-rich splicing factor 7	2p22
SRSF8	SFRS2B; SRp46 (human only)	Serine/arginine-rich splicing factor 8	11q21
SRSF9	SFRS9; SRp30c	Serine/arginine-rich splicing factor 9	12q24
SRSF10	TASR1; SRp38; SRrp40; SFRS13A	Serine/arginine-rich splicing factor 10	1p36.11
SRSF11	NET2; SFRS11; dJ677H15.2; p54	Serine/arginine-rich splicing factor 11	1p31
SRSF12	SRrp35; SFRS13B	Serine/arginine-rich splicing factor 12	6q15
TRA2A	AWMS1; HSU53209	Transformer 2 Alpha Homolog	7p15.3
TRA2B	PPP1R156; SFRS10; SRFS10; TRAN2B	Transformer 2 Beta Homolog	3q27.2

== Structure ==
SR proteins are characterized by an RS domain and at least one RNA recognition motif (RRM). The RRM is typically located near the N-terminus. The RS domain is located near the C-terminal end of an SR protein. RS domains regulate protein-protein interactions of SR proteins. Based on sequence analysis, SR proteins are suspected to be intrinsically disordered proteins resulting in an unstructured RS domain. Eight unphosphorylated repeats of arginine and serine in the RS domain take a helical form with arginine on the outside to reduce charge and in a phosphorylated state, the eight repeats of arginine and serine form a 'claw' shape.

SR proteins can have more than one RRM domain. The second RRM domain is called the RNA recognition motif homolog (RRMH). RRM domains are located near the N-terminus end of SR proteins. The RRM domain mediates the RNA interactions of the SR proteins by binding to exon splicing enhancer sequences. The RRMH usually has weaker interactions with RNA compared to the RRM domain. From NMR, the RRM domain of SRSF1, an SR protein, has a RNA binding fold structure. The RRM domain may also protect the phosphorylated RS domain, which suggests that the RS domain fits into the RRM domain.

SR proteins translocating out of the nucleus with TAP

== Location and translocation ==
SR proteins can be found in both the cytosol and in nuclear speckles in the nucleus. SR proteins are mostly found in the nucleus. Localization depends on the phosphorylation of the RS domain of the SR protein. Phosphorylation of the RS domain causes the SR proteins to enter and remain in the nucleus. Partial dephosphorylation of the RS domain causes the SR proteins to leave the nucleus and SR proteins with unphosphorylated RS domains are found in the cytosol.

SR proteins are located in two different types of nuclear speckles, interchromatin granule clusters and perichromatin fibrils. Interchromatin granule clusters are for the storage and reassembly of pre-mRNA splicing proteins. Perichromatin fibrils are areas of gene transcription and where SR proteins associate with RNA polymerase II for co-transcriptional splicing.

Two protein kinases are thought to play a role in the localization of SR proteins in the nucleus. SR protein kinase 1 (SRPK1) binds to and phosphorylates 10-12 serine residues on the N-terminal portion of the RS domain of SR proteins located in the cytosol. SR proteins can translocate into the nucleus after the serines are phosphorylated. The phosphorylated SR protein moves into the nucleus and relocates to a nuclear speckle. The second protein kinase, CLK1, then phosphorylates the remaining serines on the RS domain of the SR protein causing it to translocate out of the nuclear speckle and become associated with RNA polymerase II for co-transcriptional splicing of RNA.

Movement of SR proteins out of the nucleus is controlled by a different mechanism. SR proteins that do not leave the nucleus are called nonshuttling SR proteins and those that do leave the nucleus are called shuttling SR proteins. SRp20 (SFRS3) and 9G8 (SFRS7) are two examples of mammalian shuttling SR proteins. Both recognize and bind poly-A RNA to transport RNA. Most SR proteins that do not shuttle out of the nucleus with an RNA transcript have nuclear retention signals. Shuttling SR proteins associate with the nuclear export factor TAP for export out of the nucleus. Methylation of arginine residues in the RRM may also contribute to the export of SR proteins out of the nucleus.

== Function ==
SR proteins have been shown to have roles in alternative and constitutive splicing resulting in differential gene expression and also play a part in mRNA export, genome stabilization, non-sense mediated decay, and translation.

=== Splicing ===
The first step for SR proteins to begin alternative splicing of an RNA transcript is for SR proteins to bind on to the carboxyl-terminal domain (CTD) of the largest subunit of RNA polymerase II. The CTD is made of the conserved repeating heptapeptide sequence YSPTSPS. Different steps of transcription have different levels of phosphorylation of the CTD of RNA polymerase II. Before initiation of transcription, the CTD has low levels of phosphorylation, but it is subsequently hyperphosphorylated during initiation and elongation. The RS domain of SR proteins interacts with the hyperphosphorylated CTD during elongation of transcription.

RNA polymerase II moves from initiation to elongation once P-TEFb kinase phosphorylates Ser5 and Ser2 on RNA polymerase II. SR proteins interact with CDK9, the kinase component of P-TEFb leading to the phosphorylation of Ser2. SR proteins bind to the phosphorylated Ser2 on the CTD. The positioning of SR proteins on the RNA polymerase II allows the SR proteins to "see" the new RNA transcript first. SR proteins then moves from the RNA polymerase II to the pre-mRNA transcript.

Once on the new RNA transcript, SR proteins can then stimulate the formation of the spliceosome. SR proteins promote the binding of U1 snRNP and U2AF snRNP to the new RNA transcript to begin the formation of the spliceosome. SR proteins also help U2 recognize and bind to the branch site of the intron that is to be excised. Later in spliceosome formation, SR proteins help recruit U4/U6 and U5 snRNPs.

SR proteins are important for selecting splice sites for alternative splicing. SR proteins recognize intron and exon enhancers and silencers. SR proteins combine with SR-like proteins to select exon splicing enhancers on RNA transcripts causing U2 snRNP to bind to the upstream, adjacent branch site causing spliceosome assembly at the specific 3' site selected by the SR proteins.

SR proteins' alternative splicing promoting activities are in contrast to those of hnRNPs. hnRNPs bind to exon splicing silencers, ESS, and inhibit the inclusion of exons, thus hnRNPs are splicing repressors. SR proteins and hnRNPs compete for binding to ESEs and ESSs sequences in exons. Binding is based on concentrations of SR proteins and hnRNPs in cells. If the cell has a high concentration of SR proteins then SR proteins are more likely to bind to ESEs compared to hnRNPs binding to ESS. If the cell has a high concentration of hnRNPs then hnRNPs can outcompete SR proteins for ESSs compared to ESEs.

SR proteins may work in an antagonistic fashion, competing with each other to bind to exonic splicing enhancers. Some evidence suggests that selection of the mRNA splicing variant depends upon the relative ratios of SR proteins. SR proteins appear to be redundant. Experiments have shown that knocking down SR proteins with RNAi shows no detectable phenotype in C. elegans. After knocking down one specific SR protein another different SR protein can make up for the lost function of the SR protein that was knocked down. Specific SR proteins' activities are important for specific tissues and developmental stages.

==== Exon dependent roles ====
SR proteins select alternative upstream 3' splice sites by recruiting U2AF^{35} and U2AF^{65} to specific ESE pyrimidine sequences in the exon of the pre-mRNA transcript.

SR proteins can also alternatively select different downstream 5' splice sites by binding to ESE upstream of the splice site. The suspected mechanism is that alternative 5' splice sites are chosen when SR proteins bind to upstream ESE and interacts with U1-70K and together recruit U1 to the 5' splice site.

In constitutive splicing SR proteins bind to U2AF and U1-70K to bridge the gap between the two components of the spliceosome to mark the 3' and 5' splice sites. Constitutively spliced exons have many different SR protein binding sequences that act as constitutive splicing enhancers. The difference between alternative and constitutive splicing is that during alternative splicing the splice site choice is regulated.

==== Exon independent roles ====
Exon independent roles of SR proteins are called exon independent because it is not known if SR proteins must bind to exons in order for them to perform exon independent activities. SR proteins can bind to U1 and U2AF while they are bound to the 3' and 5' splice sites at the same time without binding to the pre-mRNA transcript. The SR protein thus creates a bridge across the intron in what is called a cross-intron interaction. SR proteins also recruit the tri-snRNP molecule U4/U6·U5 to the maturing spliceosome complex by interacting with RS domains in the tri-snRNP. SR proteins might be able to bind directly to the 5' splice site and recruit the U1 complex of the spliceosome.

=== mRNA export ===
SR proteins can be either shuttling SR proteins or nonshuttling SR proteins. Some SR proteins associate with RNA export factor TAP, a nuclear export factor, to shuttle RNA out of the nucleus. The shuttling property of the SR protein is determined by the phosphorylation status of the RS domain. When hyperphosphorylated, SR proteins bind to pre-mRNA transcripts, but SR proteins become partially dephosphorylated during transcription allowing them to interact with NXF1. Thus the phosphorylation of the RS domain determines if the SR proteins stays with the RNA transcript after co-transcription splicing and while the mRNP matures. If the RS domain remains phosphorylated, then the SR protein will not shuttle from the nucleus to the cytosol. The phosphorylated SR protein will be sorted away from the mRNA transcript further preventing shuttling of the phosphorylated SR proteins. If the RS domain becomes partially dephosphorylated then the SR protein will shuttle out of the nucleus into the cytosol. The methylation and charge of arginine residues in the RRM domain also contributes to the export of SR proteins associated with mRNA.

=== Genomic stabilization ===
SR proteins can increase genome stability by preventing the formation of R loops in the DNA strand that is actively being transcribed during transcription. SR protein SC35 has the ability to bind to the largest subunit of RNA polymerase II at the phosphorylated C-terminal domain. Once RNA polymerase II begins making the new RNA strand, SR proteins move from the C-terminal domain of the RNA polymerase II to the new RNA strand. The movement of SR proteins from the RNA polymerase II to the new RNA strand prevents the new RNA strand, which is complementary to the template DNA strand, from binding to the template DNA strand thus preventing R loops.

SR proteins can also stabilize DNA during transcription through an interaction with Topoisomerase I. When Topoisomerase I, Topo I, reduces supercoiling caused by transcription when it is bound to DNA. When Topo I is not bound to DNA it can phosphorylate the SR protein SF2/ASF. Topo I and SF2/ASF interact when SF2/ASF is hypophosphorylated during transcription elongation. SR proteins can become hypophosphorylated during elongation decreasing their affinity for RNA polymerase II causing SR proteins to move to Topo I. When Topo I complexes with SF2/ASF, it can no longer undo the supercoiling of DNA causing elongation to pause. Topo I phosphorylates S2F/ASF increasing the SR proteins affinity for RNA poly II moving S2F/ASF from the Topo I back to RNA poly II allowing elongation to continue.

=== Nonsense-mediated decay ===
SR proteins can alternatively splice pre-mRNA transcripts to include nonsense-mediated decay (NMD) codons in the mRNA. The most common method of an NMD response in cells is alternative splicing. If a pre-mRNA transcript has a duplicated 5' splice site and SR proteins are over expressed then NMD can be upregulated. The splice variant with the NMD codon is chosen more often during splicing and the cell is more sensitive to NMD further down stream during translation. It is estimated that close to 30% of alternatively spliced mRNA are degraded by NMD. SR protein concentrations in cells can be auto-regulated by NMD codons in SR proteins pre-mRNA. For example, SC35 SR protein can alternatively splice a SC35 pre-mRNA to include a NMD codon in the mRNA. The location of SR protein binding on a pre-mRNA strand and which SR proteins are binding determine the NMD activity of a cell.

=== Translation ===
SR proteins can indirectly and directly influence translation. SR proteins SF2/ASF alternatively splices the transcript of MNK2. MNK2 is a kinase that initiates translation. High levels of SF2/ASF produce an isoform of MNK2 that increases cap-dependent translation by promoting phosphorylation of MAPK-independent eIF4E. SF2/ASF recruits components of the mTOR pathway, specifically S6K1. SF2/ASF creates an oncogenic form of S6K1 to increase the prevalence of cap-dependent translation. SF2/ASF can also interact with polyribosomes to directly influence translation of mRNA into protein by recruiting component of the mTOR pathway. SF2/ASF increases the phosphorylation of rpS6 and eIF4B by S6K1. 9G8 increases the translation of unspliced mRNA with a constitutive transport sequence.

== Diseases ==
Genetic diversity is increased by the alternative splicing activities of SR proteins, but splicing can also result in mutations in mRNA strands. Mutations in pre-mRNA can affect the correct splice site selection for SR proteins. Mutations in mRNA, because of nonsense-associated altered splicing by SR proteins, have been linked to ataxia telangiectasia, neurofibromatosis type 1, several cancers, HIV-1, and spinal muscular atrophy.

=== Cancer ===
Several SR proteins have been implicated in cancer. Elevated levels of SF2/ASF, SC35, and SRp20 have all been associated with breast and ovarian cancer development. SF2/ASF is also upregulated in lung, kidney, and liver tumors. SFRS1, the gene that codes for SF2/ASF, is a known proto-oncogene. Mutations in the ESE sequence of BRCA1 have been linked to irregular exon skipping because SF2/ASF cannot recognize the ESE.

=== HIV ===
Three SR proteins have been implicated in HIV-1, SRp75, SF2/ASF, and SRp40. All three SR proteins are important for alternatively splicing the viral pre-mRNA. HIV can also change the concentrations of specific SR proteins in the cell. New drug treatments for HIV infections are looking to target specific SR proteins to prevent the virus from replicating in cells. One treatment works by blocking SR proteins from selecting 3' splice sites for an important HIV-1 regulatory protein.

=== Spinal muscular atrophy ===
Spina muscular atrophy is caused by a transition from cytosine to thymine. The transition mutation results in exon 7 being skipped during splicing. The exon could be skipped for two reasons. The first is that the mutation prevents SF2/ASF from recognizing the correct ESE. The second is that the mutation creates an ESS for an hnRNP to bind and block splicing of the exon.

== See also ==
- Spliceosome
- Exon
- Intron
- Exon Junction Complex
