= Kelch-like protein 36 =

KLHL36

Identifiers
- Aliases: KLHL36, C16orf44, kelch like family member 36
- External IDs: MGI: 2385305; GeneCards: KLHL36

Gene location (Human)
Chr.	Chromosome 16 (human)
Band	16q24.1	Start	84,648,511 bp
Band	16q24.1	End	84,667,686 bp

Gene location (Mouse)
Chr.	Chromosome 8 (mouse)
Band	8|8 E1	Start	120,589,005 bp
Band	8|8 E1	End	120,603,734 bp
RNA expression pattern
Bgee	Human / Mouse (ortholog); Top expressed in: seminal vesicula; cardia; right ventricle; renal medulla; skin of hip; mucosa of sigmoid colon; germinal epithelium; oral cavity; pylorus; vena cava / Top expressed in: neural layer of retina; granulocyte; right kidney; yolk sac; proximal tubule; embryo; spermatocyte; embryo; ventricular zone; lumbar subsegment of spinal cord; More reference expression data
BioGPS	n/a
Gene ontology
Molecular function	ubiquitin-protein transferase activity
Cellular component	Cul3-RING ubiquitin ligase complex
Biological process	protein ubiquitination
Sources:Amigo / QuickGO
Orthologs
Databases	NCBI: entry; OMA: entry
Species	Human	Mouse
Entrez	79786	234796
Ensembl	ENSG00000135686	ENSMUSG00000031828
UniProt	Q8N4N3	Q8R124
RefSeq (mRNA)	NM_001303451; NM_024731	NM_146219
RefSeq (protein)	NP_001290380; NP_079007	NP_666331
Location (UCSC)	Chr 16: 84.65 – 84.67 Mb	Chr 8: 120.59 – 120.6 Mb
PubMed search
- Wikidata
View/Edit Human	View/Edit Mouse

Kelch-Like Protein 36 (abbreviated KLHL36) is a protein that in humans is encoded by the KLHL36 gene. Although the gene's specific function has yet to be characterized, it is predicted to serve as a substrate adaptor for Cullin-RING E3 ubiquitin ligase (CRL3) complexes, contributing to proteostasis.

== Gene ==
In humans, the KLHL 36 gene consists of 5 exons and 4 introns spanning 19,176 base pairs on the positive strand of chromosome 16 (16q24.1).

The gene is a member of the Kelch-like gene family, which is characterized by a conserved BTB-BACK-Kelch domain architecture. Kelch-like genes encode proteins that recognize and bind specific protein substrates, bind the scaffold protein cullin 3 in the CRL3 complex, and pass the substrate protein to the complex to facilitate ubiquitylation and degradation at the proteasome.

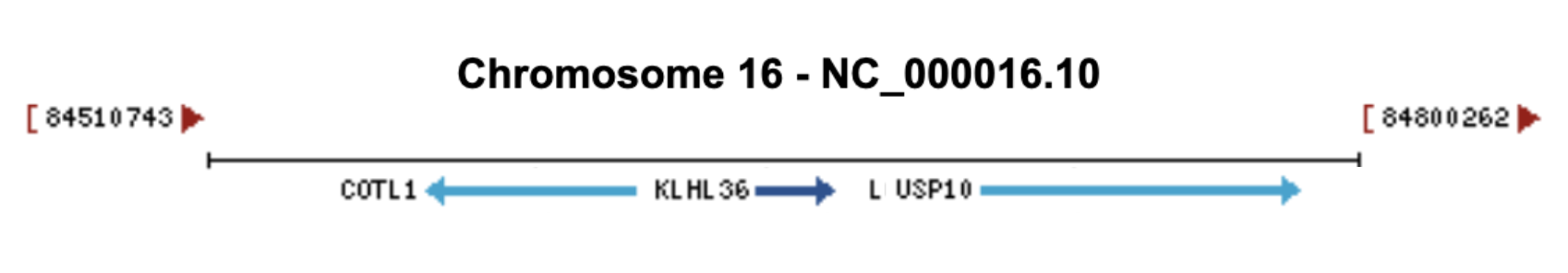
Figure 1. KLHL36 location on Chromosome 16 in Homo sapiens. KLHL36 is surrounded by two protein coding genes, USP10 downstream on the positive strand, and COTL1 upstream on the negative strand.

== Homology ==
=== Orthologs ===
The KLHL36 gene is highly conserved in vertebrates. Orthologs of KLHL36 are present in jawed vertebrates tracing back to cartilaginous fishes, although no orthologs have been identified in jawless vertebrates or invertebrates. This suggests that the KLHL36 gene originated in a common ancestor of jawed vertebrates roughly 462 millions years ago.

KLHL is remarkably conserved across jawed vertebrates, sharing a greater than 77 percent sequence identity with many species of cartilaginous fishes, whose lineages diverged from that of humans roughly 462 million years ago. KLHL36 orthologs are summarized in Table 1.

Table 1. Divergence of Selected Orthologs of Human KLHL36
Genus and species	Common name	Taxonomic group	Median Date of Divergence (Millions of Years ago)	Accession #	Sequence length (aa)	Sequence identity to human protein (%)	Sequence similarity to human protein (%)
Homo sapiens	Humans	Hominidae	0	NP_079007.2	616	100	100
Pan paniscus	Bonobo	Hominidae	6.4	XP_054956502.1	616	99.8	100
Nasalis larvatus	Proboscis Monkey	Primata	28.8	KAL4835633.1	616	99.2	99.7
Mus musculus	House Mouse	Rodentia	87	NP_666331.1	613	85.7	92.2
Canis lupus familiaris	Domestic Dog	Carnivora	94	XP_005620696.2	616	96.8	98.5
Physeter macrocephalus	Sperm Whale	Artiodactyla	94	XP_023980819.1	616	96.1	97.7
Notamacropus eugenii	Tamar Wallaby	Marsupialia	160	XP_072492309.1	615	89.8	94.6
Ornithorhynchus anatinus	Platypus	Monotremata	180	XP_001509771.2	616	87.2	92.9
Gallus gallus	Red Junglefowl	Aves	319	XP_040537292.1	615	85.4	92
Dermochelys coriacea	Leatherback Sea Turtle	Reptilia	319	XP_038224216.1	615	85.1	92.4
Alligator sinensis	Chinese Alligator	Reptilia	319	XP_006022804.1	615	85.1	92.5
Geotrypetes seraphini	Gaboon Caecilian	Amphibia	352	XP_033796775.1	615	80.4	89.3
Eleutherodactylus coqui	Common Coqui	Amphibia	352	XP_066439605.1	615	72.4	83.8
Ambystoma mexicanum	Axolotl	Amphibia	352	XP_069492346.1	615	72.9	85.6
Latimeria chalumnae	West Indian Ocean Coelacanth	Sarcopterygii	415	XP_069492346.1	614	78.7	87.5
Thalassophryne amazonica	Amazon Toadfish	Actinopterygii	429	XP_034031579.1	611	56.4	70.7
Danio rerio	Zebrafish	Actinopterygii	429	NP_001018416.3	610	61	74.6
Hypanus sabinus	Atlantic Stingray	Chondrychthytes	462	XP_059849157.1	612	77.8	86.9
Callorhinchus milii	Australian Ghostshark	Chondrychthytes	462	XP_042196266.1	615	78.2	85.8
Scyliorhinus canicula	Small Spotted Catshark	Chondrychthytes	462	XP_038662242.1	612	77.3	85.9

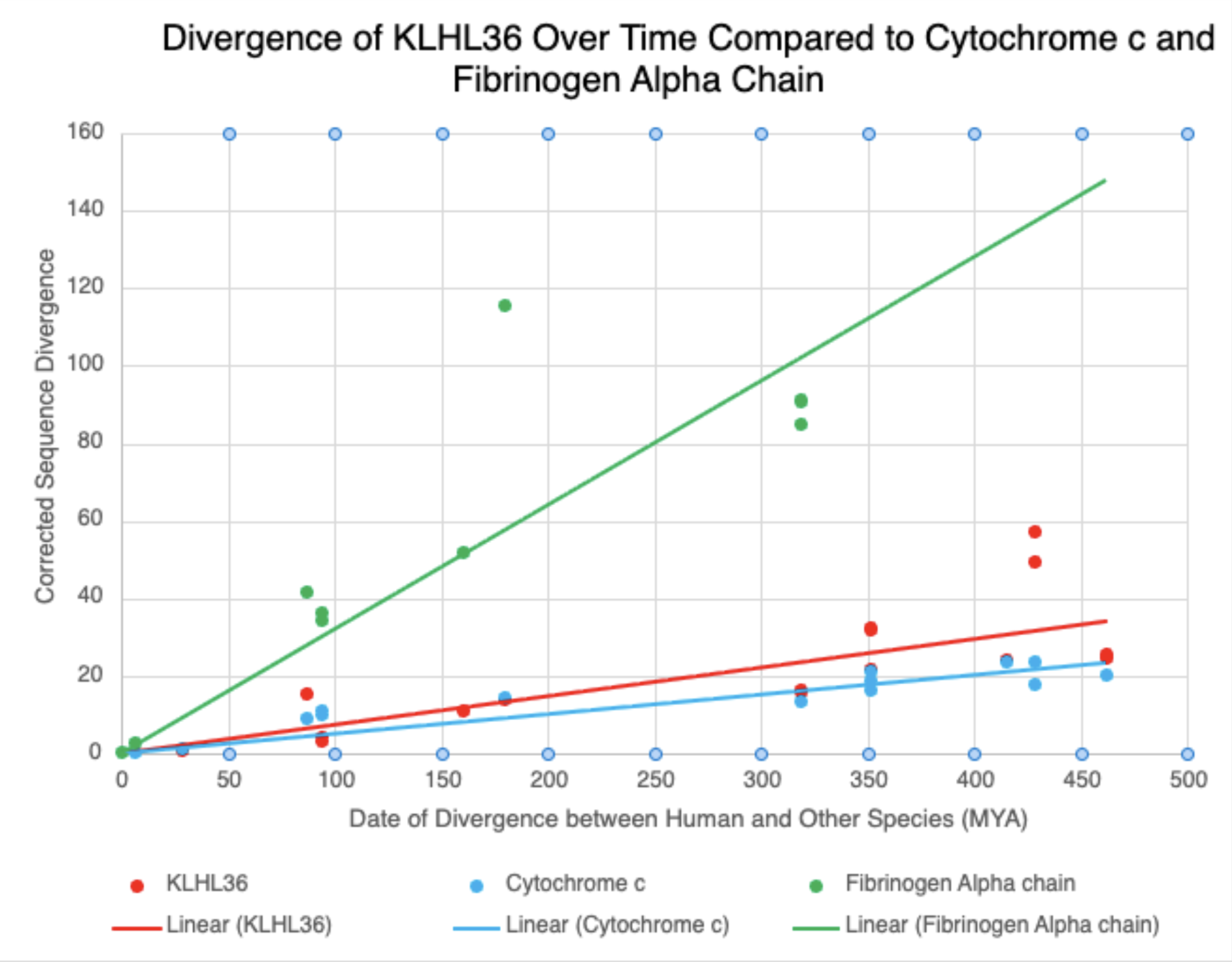
Figure 2. KLHL36 Corrected number of amino acid changes over evolutionary history. Cytochrome c represents a highly conserved control, and Fibrinogen alpha represents a poorly conserved control.

Among the 20 selected orthologs, the amino acid identity at a given position was conserved in all orthologs at 35.4% of positions.

Figure 2 shows the divergence of KLHL36 in terms of corrected number of amino acid changes over millions of years. KLHL36 is remarkably highly conserved, similar to cytochrome c, with minimal changes in amino acid composition over time. Corrected amino acid changes are calculated as 100 * ln(1 - (M/100)), where M represents the observed number of amino acid changes per hundred amino acids in selected orthologs of KLHL36.

=== Paralogs ===
54 paralogs of KLHL36 have been identified, with its closest relatives being KLHL13 and KLHL26. The KLHL family of genes contains 42 genes from KLHL1 to KLHL42. Paralogs of KLHL36 are summarized in Table 2.

Table 2. Identity and Similarity of KLHL36 Most Closely Related Relatives
Gene/Paralog (Isoform)	Sequence Length (Amino Acids)	Query Coverage	Percent Identity Match	Percent Similarity Match	Number of Isoforms	Accession Number
KLHL36 (1)	616	100	100	100	3	NP_079007.2
KLHL13 (e)	604	94	38	60	7	NP_001161775.2
KLHL26 (3)	604	94	36	55	6	NP_001332911.1
KLHL32 (n)	556	84	34	51	15	NP_001310192.1
KLHL22	634	96	33	51	9	NP_116164.2
KLHL31	634	93	32	52	1	NP_001003760.2
KLHL14	628	91	31	51	2	NP_116164.2
KLHL34	644	94	29	45	1	NP_695002.1
KLHL18	574	88	29	47	1	NP_079286.2
KLHL15	604	89	29	47	1	NP_085127.2
KLHL2 (1)	593	89	28	49	5	NP_009177.3
KLHL 3 (2)	555	90	28	49	3	NP_001244123.1
KEAP1	624	93	28	43	1	NP_036421.2
KLHL17	642	93	27	46	6	NP_938073.1
KLHL1 (1)	748	83	27	44	4	NP_065917.1
KLHL12 (1)	606	92	27	43	9	NP_001289980.
KLHL10 (1)	608	92	27	43	2	NP_001316524.1
KLHL28 (1)	585	91	27	42	6	NP_001295041.
KLHL25	589	94	27	42	1	NP_071925.2

== Expression ==
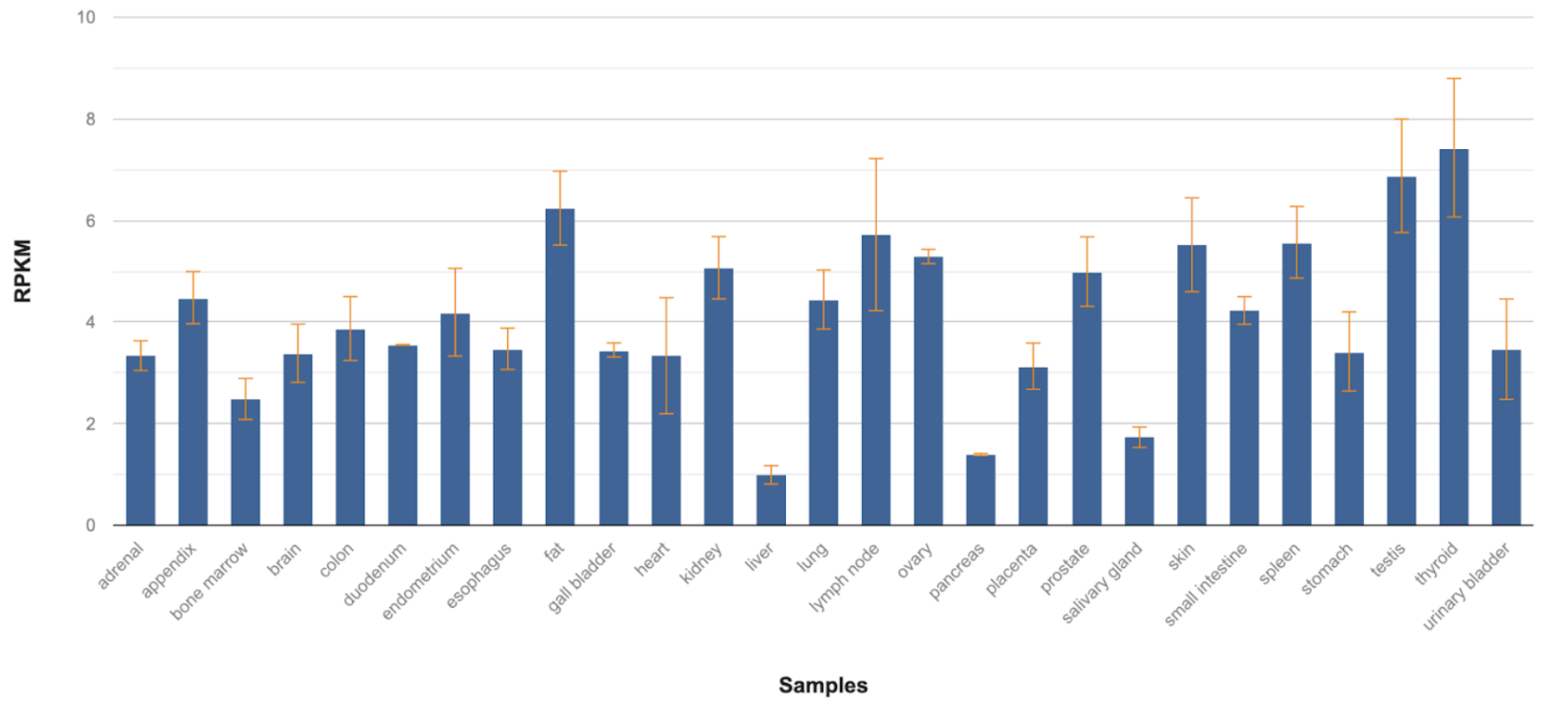
Figure 3. Graph of KLHL36 Expression Across Tissues. RPKM, or reads per kilobase per million reads, is a normalized measure of gene expression from RNA sequencing.

KLHL36 is expressed ubiquitously at moderate levels across all tissues, with moderate variation across tissues. The highest expression of the protein is observed in the testes, fat, and thyroid.

Whole body transcriptomic tissue analyses have revealed that, while KLHL36 is expressed at its highest absolute values in the testes, fat, and thyroid, it is expressed at its highest levels relative to other proteins in cells of the immune system, such as B cells, T cells, and monocytes.

== Transcript ==
There are 6 known transcript variants of KLHL36, the most common transcript variant being transcript variant 1. Transcript variant 1 encodes the longest and most common isoform, isoform 1. Transcript variant 1 is 7,559 nucleotides in length and contains 5 exons. Its 5' untranslated region is 158 nucleotides in length and its 3' untranslated region is 5,556 nucleotides in length.

Transcript Variants X1 and X2 contain the same coding sequence and encode an identical protein to transcript variant 1, with slightly differing 5' untranslated regions. Transcript Variant 2 encodes a slightly different protein product, missing part of the internal amino acid sequence but with the Kelch motifs at the C terminal intact. Transcript Variant X4 is significantly truncated, missing a large portion of the coding sequence and the 3' UTR and containing no Kelch motifs. Transcript Variants of KLHL36 and their corresponding protein isoforms are summarized in Table 3.

Table 3. Homo sapiens KLHL36 Transcript Variants and Corresponding Protein Isoforms
Transcript Variant	Accession Number	Length (Nucleotides)	Exon Count	Corresponding Protein Isoform	Accession Number	Amino Acid Length
Transcript Variant 1	NM_024731.4	7559	5	Protein Isoform 1	NP_079007.2	616
Transcript Variant X1	XM_047434648.1	7547	5	Protein Isoform X1	XP_047290604.1	616
Transcript Variant X2	XM_005256149.3	7503	5	Protein Isoform X1	XP_005256206.1	616
Transcript Variant X3	XM_047434649.1	7797	5	Protein Isoform X1	XP_047290605.1	616
Transcript Variant 2	NM_001303451.2	7370	4	Protein Isoform 2	NP_001290380.1	553
Transcript Variant X4	XM_047434650.1	1380	4	Protein Isoform X2	XP_047290606.1	372

Many RNA binding proteins are predicted to bind to the 5' UTR KLHL36 Transcript Variant 1 mRNA, including YBX1, Vts1, RBM4, KHSRP, and RBMX. Several additional RNA binding proteins are predicted to bind to the 3' UTR, including YBX1, PUM2, EIF4B, MBNL2, ACO1, KHSRP, RBMY1A1, SRSF10, YTHDC1, ELAVL1, FUS, ZRANB2, PABPC1, and SFRS9. RNA binding proteins that are predicted to bind the promoter of KLHL36 include ZNF667, ZNF530, ZIC4, SNF257, TFAP2A, TFAP2C, ZTBT24, KLF10, KLF12, SREBF1, KLF5, ZVED4, and NFYB.

Figure 4 consists of a conceptual translation of KLHL36 Transcript Variant 1 coding sequence, which demonstrates the layout of the mRNA and the corresponding amino acids, protein domains, and exon boundaries.

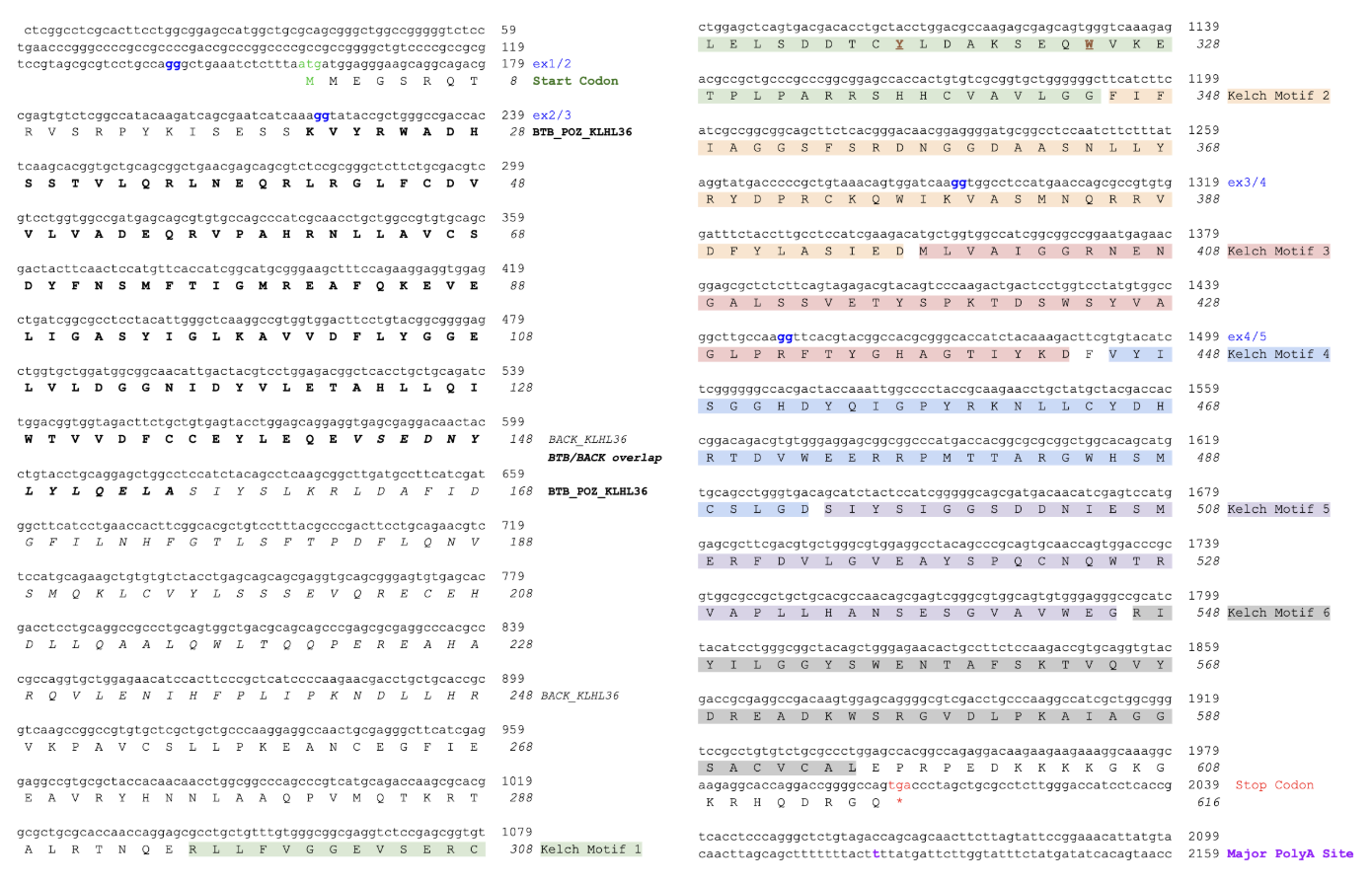
Figure 4a. Conceptual Translation of KLHL36 Transcript Variant 1 mRNA, including BTB/POZ domain, BACK domain, Kelch Motifs, start and stop codons, and exon boundaries.

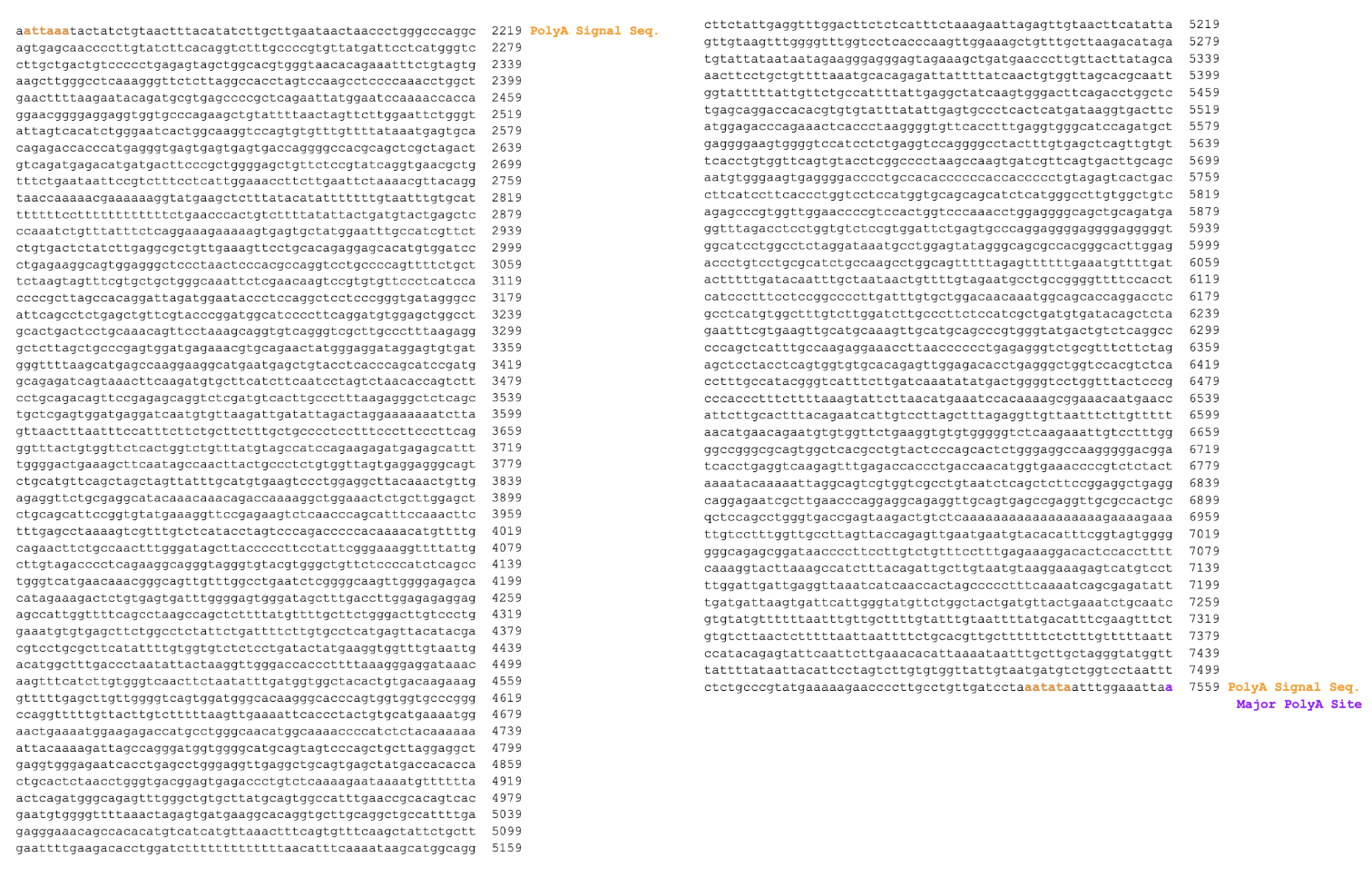
Figure 4b. Conceptual Translation of KLHL36 Transcript Variant 1 mRNA, including 3' UTR, polyA signal sequences, and major polyadenylation sites.

== Protein ==
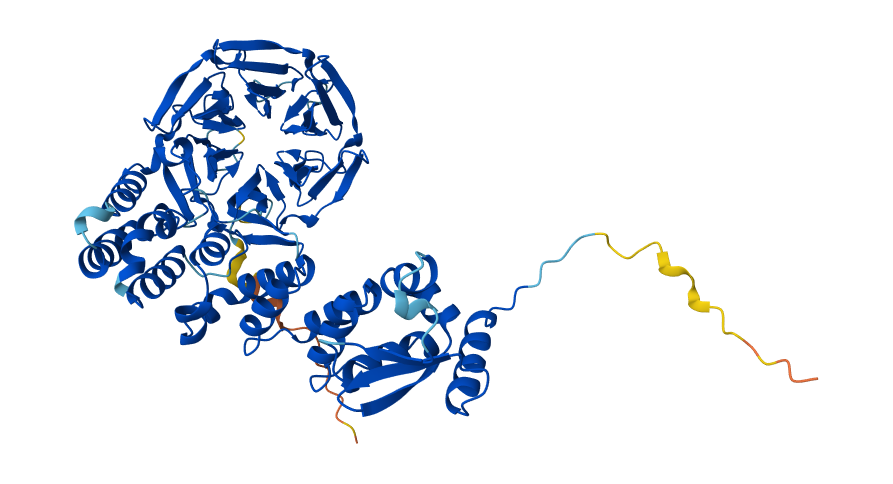
Figure 3. AlphaFold v4 predicted tertiary structure of Homo sapiens KLHL36 protein isoform 1.

There are 3 protein isoforms of KLHL36, the most common and longest being isoform 1. Isoform 1 is a kelch-like protein that is 616 amino acids in length with a molecular mass of roughly 70 kilodaltons and an isoelectric point of 5.5. The charge of the protein in a neutral environment is -12, with no charge clusters identified.

The protein contains a BTB/POZ domain of 135 amino acids at its N-terminus, which is predicted to mediate homodimerization and be involved in cullin 3 binding. At its C-terminus, the protein contains 6 Kelch-motif domains which form a β-propeller that is predicted to be involved in substrate binding.

There are no unusually scarce or common amino acids present in KLHL36. The secondary structure of the protein is dominated by alpha helices towards the N-terminus in the region of the BTB/POZ Domain and the BACK domain, and by beta sheets towards the C-terminus in the β-propeller domain.

Immunofluorescence staining of KLHL36 in the A-549 cell line suggests that the protein localizes to the cytoplasm. DeepLoc-2.0 analysis of KLHL36 supports this finding, calculating its highest likelihood of subcellular localization to be the cytoplasm at 0.70, followed by the nucleus at 0.48 and the lysosome at 0.25. Analysis of KLHL36's primary structure reveals no signal peptide, no transmembrane domains, no mitochondrial targeting, no nuclear localization sequence, and no tracking motifs.

PhosPhoSite Plus and DTU Health Tech Bioinformatic Services predict many post-translational modifications of KLHL36, including phosphorylation, ubiquitylation, and acetylation. These modifications likely contribute to regulating the function of KLHL36 by inducing conformational changes and regulating KLHL36 abundance through ubiquitylation and subsequent proteasomal degradation.

== Protein Interactions ==
Cullin 3 has been shown to directly bind multiple BTB domains through a conserved amino terminal domain. It is likely that cullin 3 binds the BTB domain present at the N-terminal of KLHL36 to mediate ubiquitylation and degradation of substrate proteins bound by KLHL36. It is not currently known what proteins KLHL36 might bind to facilitate their degradation.

STRING Functional Protein Association Database identifies 10 proteins with which KLHL36 is predicted to interact. These proteins are summarized in Table 4.

Table 4. STRING Predicted Interaction Partners of Homo sapiens KLHL36
Protein	Full Name	Basis for Interaction	Statistical Significance of Basis	Subcellular Localization	Brief Protein Overview
CUL3	Cullin 3	Co-Expression, Experimental Data, Co-Mentioned in Abstracts	0.049, 0.428, 0.058	Cytoplasm, nucleoplasm, microtubules, cytokinetic bridge	Component of cullin-RING-based BCR E3 ubiquitin-protein ligase complexes, which mediate ubiquitylation and proteasomal degradation of target proteins.
DCLK2	Serine/threonine-protein kinase, doublecortin like kinase 2	Experimental Data, Co-Mentioned in Abstracts	0.091, 0.581	Cytoplasm, microtubules	Part of CaMK protein kinase family that is thought to have reduced affinity and dependence for Ca2+ and CAM compared to other members of the CaMK family.
CXorf56	STING1 ER exit protein 1	Experimental Data	0.46	Nucleoplasm, centrosome	Uncharacterized
PACRG	Parkin coregulated gene protein	Experimental Data	0.568	Mitochondria, cilia, flagella	Suppresses cell death induced by accumulation of unfolded Pael receptor.
APEX1	Apurinic/apyrimidinic endodeoxyribonuclease 1	Experimental Data	0.479	Nucleoplasm, centrosome	Multifunctional protein thought to play a central role in cellular response to oxidative stress, involved in DNA repair and redox regulation of transcription.
KIAA0513	Uncharacterized protein KIAA0513	Co-Expression, Co-Mentioned in Abstracts	0.138, 0.522	Cytosol	Uncharacterized
FAM92B/CIBAR2	CBY1 interacting BAR domain containing 2	Co-Expression, Co-Mentioned in Abstracts	0.049, 0.448	Cytoplasm	May play a role in ciliogenesis, cooperates with CBY1 to recruit endosomal vesicles at distal appendages during ciliogenesis.
CEP104	Centrosomal protein of 104 kDa	Co-Expression	0.457	Centrosome, cytoplasm	Required for ciliogenesis and structural integrity at ciliary tip.
TMEM127	Transmembrane protein 127	Co-Expression	0.451	N/A	Negative regulator of TOR signaling pathway that controls cell proliferation, tumor suppressing.
SLC15A5	Solute carrier family 15 member 5	Co-Mentioned in Abstracts	0.571	N/A	Proton oligopeptide cotransporter

== Clinical Significance ==
UniProt identifies 770 variants of the KLHL36 gene, with 94 marked as "pathogenic" or "likely pathogenic". A single nucleotide polymorphism downstream of KLHL36 (rs12716755) has been reported as a risk variant for early onset Alzheimer's disease. A genome-wide association study (GWAS) reported an aggregation of 134 single nucleotide polymorphisms implicated in psychological resilience and stress-related psychiatric outcomes in the region of KLHL36 on chromosome 16.

Additionally, transcriptomic analyses have revealed disease-associated changes in KLHL36 expression. KLHL36 mRNA levels have been shown to be lower in gastrointestinal tumors, and increased expression is correlated with positive prognoses in pancreatic cancer and cholangiocarcinoma. Additionally, elevated KLHL36 levels have been associated with reduced tumor proliferation in pancreatic adenocarcinoma models, suggesting a possible tumor suppressor role. Analyses of triple-negative breast cancer tumors have found that KLHL36 expression can be induced by TNFα stimulation, and that induction of expression can be reversed by the flavonoid apigenin.

KLHL36 has also been implicated in psychiatric contexts. In rodent models, antidepressant treatment and exercise have been negatively correlated with expression of KLHL36 in the brain. One sequencing analysis found that levels of KLHL36 were significantly increased in both individuals affected by seasonal affective disorder and suicidal ideation.
