= Poison exon =

Biological phenomenon

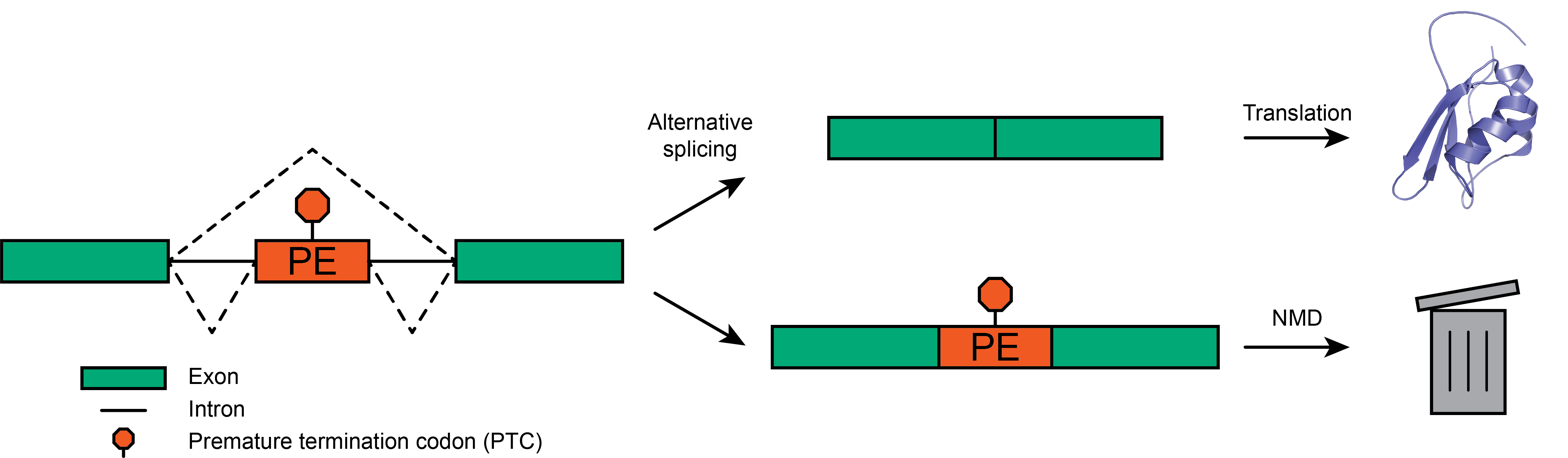
Certain transcripts contain poison exons that can be incorporated via alternative splicing. Skipping of the poison exon leads to a productive transcript that is translated to protein. Incorporation of the poison exon introduces a premature termination codon into the transcript that leads to degradation of the transcript via nonsense-mediated decay. (PDB: 2N3L)

Poison exons (PEs); also called premature termination codon (PTC) exons or nonsense-mediated decay (NMD) exons are a class of cassette exons that contain PTCs. Inclusion of a PE in a transcript targets the transcript for degradation via NMD. PEs are generally highly conserved elements of the genome and are thought to have important regulatory roles in biology. Targeting PE inclusion or exclusion in certain transcripts is being evaluated as a therapeutic strategy.

== Discovery ==
In 2002, a model termed regulated unproductive splicing and translation (RUST) was proposed based on the finding that many (~one-third) alternatively spliced transcripts contain PEs. In this model, coupling alternative splicing to NMD (AS-NMD) is thought to tune transcript levels to regulate protein expression. Alternative splicing may also lead to NMD via other pathways besides PE inclusion, e.g., intron retention.

PEs were initially characterized in RNA-binding proteins from the SR protein family. Genes for other RNA-binding proteins (RBPs) such as those for heterogenous nuclear ribonucleoprotein (hnRNP) also contain PEs. Numerous chromatin regulators also contain PEs, though these are less conserved than PEs within RBPs such as the SR proteins. Multiple spliceosomal components contain PEs. Certain PEs may occur only in specific tissues.

PE-containing transcripts generally represent a minority of the overall transcript population, in part due to their active degradation via NMD, though this relative abundance can be elevated upon inhibition of NMD or certain biological states. Certain PE-containing transcripts are resistant to NMD and may be translated into truncated proteins.

== Regulation ==
Cis-regulatory elements neighboring PEs have been found to affect PE inclusion.

Many proteins whose corresponding genes contain PEs autoregulate PE inclusion in their respective transcripts and thereby control their own levels via a feedback loop. Cross-regulation of PE inclusion has also been observed.

Differential splicing of PEs is implicated in biological processes such as differentiation, neurodevelopment, dispersal of nuclear speckles during hypoxia, tumorigenesis, organism growth, and T cell expansion.

Protein kinases that regulate phosphorylation of splicing factors can affect splicing processes, thus kinase inhibitors may affect inclusion of PEs. For example, CMGC kinase inhibitors and CDK9 inhibitors have been found to induce PE inclusion in RBM39.

Small molecules that modulate chromatin accessibility can affect PE inclusion.

Mutations in splicing factors can lead to inclusion of PEs in certain transcripts.

PE inclusion can be regulated by external variables such as temperature and electrical activity. For example, PE inclusion in RBM3 transcript is lowered during hypothermia. This is mediated by temperature-dependent binding of the splicing factor HNRNPH1 to the RBM3 transcript. The neuronal RBPs NOVA1/2 are translocated from the nucleus to the cytoplasm during pilocarpine-induced seizure in mice, and it was found that NOVA1/2 regulates the expression of cryptic PEs. The glycosyltransferase O-GlcNAc transferase is responsible for installing the O-GlcNAc post-translational modification and contains a PE. It has been frequently observed that pharmacological or genetic perturbations that elevate cellular O-GlcNAc levels increase PE inclusion in the OGT transcript.

=== Disease ===
Proper regulation of PE inclusion and exclusion is important for health. Genetic mutations can affect inclusion of PEs and cause disease. For example, loss of CCAR1 leads to PE inclusion in the FANCA transcript, resulting in a Fanconi anemia phenotype.

Dysregulation of components of the splicing machinery can also cause dysregulation of PE inclusion. Mutations in the splicing factor SF3B1 have been found to promote PE inclusion in BRD9, reducing BRD9 mRNA and protein levels and leading to melanomagenesis. Mutations in U2AF1 promote PE inclusion in EIF4A2, leading to impaired global mRNA translation and acute myeloid leukemia (AML) chemoresistance through the integrated stress response pathway. The splicing factor SRSF6 contains a PE whose skipping is connected to T cell acute lymphoblastic leukemia (T-ALL), and PE inclusion in SRSF10 is linked to acute lymphoblastic leukemia (ALL).

Intronic mutations can lead to PE inclusion, such as in the case of SCN1A, where mutations within intron 20 promote inclusion of the nearby PE 20N, leading to Dravet syndrome-like phenotypes in mouse models. An intronic mutation in FLNA has been found to impair binding of the splicing regulator PTBP1, leading to inclusion of a poison exon in FLNA transcripts that causes a brain-specific malformation. In RAD50, TGAGT deletion is associated with a cryptic poison exon that occurs 30 nucleotides downstream within intron 21 mediated by altered U2AF recognition.

Differential inclusion of PEs in various splicing factor and hnRNP genes has been reported in type 1 diabetes. SRSF2 mutations have been found to promote PE inclusion in the epigenetic regulator EZH2, resulting in impaired hematopoietic differentiation.

The TRA2B PE is essential for male fertility and meiotic cell division in mouse models. Deletion of this PE leads to an azoospermia phenotype.

== Clinical relevance ==
=== Diagnostics ===
With the advent of next-generation sequencing technologies, diagnostic genetic testing has emerged as a powerful tool to diagnose afflictions associated with specific genetic variants. Many diagnostic genetic testing efforts have focused on exome sequencing. PE annotations may improve the diagnostic yield of these tests for certain diseases. For example, variants that affect PE inclusion in sodium channel genes (SCN1A, SCN2A, and SCN8A) have been found to be associated with epilepsies, and analogous variants in SNRPB have been found to be associated with cerebrocostomandibular syndrome.

=== Therapeutic discovery ===
As PE inclusion results in transcript degradation, targeted PE inclusion or exclusion is being evaluated as a therapeutic strategy. This strategy may prove especially applicable towards targets whose gene products are not easily ligandable such as "undruggable" proteins. Targeting PE inclusion/exclusion has been demonstrated with both small molecules and antisense oligonucleotides (ASOs). Small molecules may modulate splicing by stabilizing alternative splice sites. ASOs may block specific splice sites or target certain cis-regulatory elements to promote splicing at other sites. These ASOs may also be referred to as splice-switching oligonucleotides (SSOs). ASO walks tiling different ASOs across a gene sequence may be necessary to identify ASOs that have the desired effect on PE inclusion.

Stoke Therapeutics is evaluating a strategy termed Targeted Augmentation of Nuclear Gene Output (TANGO). Targeting exon 20N in SCN1A mRNA with the antisense oligonucleotide zorevunersen (STK-001) blocks inclusion of this PE, leading to elevated levels of the productive SCN1A transcript and the gene product sodium channel protein 1 subunit alpha (Na_{V}1.1). In mouse models of Dravet syndrome, which is driven by mutations in SCN1A, zorevunersen was able to reduce incidence of electrographic seizures and sudden unexpected death in epilepsy and prolong survival. As of October 2024, zorevunersen is being evaluated in phase 2 clinical trials (NCT04740476). Zorevunersen received FDA Breakthrough Therapy Designation in December 2024. Also in December 2024, Stoke Therapeutics disclosed that zorevunersen is generally well tolerated and shows substantial and sustained reductions in convulsive seizure frequency. Stoke Therapeutics expects to launch a phase 3 clinical trial in 2025 evaluating zorevunersen for reduction in seizure frequency as the primary endpoint and cognition and behavioral changes as secondary endpoints.

Stoke Therapeutics is also evaluating the ASO STK-002 for treatment of autosomal dominant optic atrophy (ADOA). STK-002 promotes removal of a PE in the transcript of OPA1, leading to elevated OPA1 protein levels.

Remix Therapeutics developed REM-422, which is an oral small molecule that promotes PE inclusion in the oncogene MYB. REM-422 was discovered through a screening campaign for molecules that promote PE inclusion in MYB. Subsequent in vitro experiments showed that REM-422 selectively facilitates binding of the U1 snRNP complex to oligonucleotides containing the MYB 5' splice site sequence. In various AML cell lines, REM-422 leads to degradation of MYB mRNA and lower MYB protein levels. REM-422 demonstrated antitumor activity in mouse xenograft models of acute myeloid leukemia. As of October 2024, REM-422 is being evaluated in phase 1 clinical trials (NCT06118086, NCT06297941). The splicing modulator small molecule risdiplam, originally developed to promote exon 7 inclusion in the SMN2 transcript for treatment of spinal muscular atrophy, dose-dependently promotes PE inclusion in the MYB transcript as well.

Rgenta Therapeutics has also developed RGT-61159, an oral small molecule that promotes PE inclusion in MYB, as a potential treatment for adenoid cystic carcinoma (ACC). RGT-61159 is being evaluated in phase 1 clinical trials (NCT06462183).

PTC Therapeutics is evaluating the oral small molecule PTC518 as a treatment for Huntington's disease. PTC518 was well-tolerated and showed dose-dependent decreases in HTT mRNA and HTT protein levels in a phase 1 clinical trial. As of October 2024, PTC518 is being evaluated in phase 2 clinical trials (NCT05358717). In December 2024, Novartis entered a global license and collaboration agreement with PTC Therapeutics for PTC518 with an upfront payment of $1.0 billion and up to $1.9 billion in development, regulatory, and sales milestones.

Therapeutic targeting of poison exon inclusion/exclusion has also been proposed for oncogenic splicing factors, BRD9 (for treatment of cancer), SYNGAP1, RBM3 (for treatment of neurodegeneration), and CFTR (for treatment of cystic fibrosis).
