= CACTIN =

Protein-coding gene in humans

Identifiers
- Aliases: CACTIN, C19orf29, NY-REN-24, fSAPc, cactin, spliceosome C complex subunit
- External IDs: OMIM: 618536; MGI: 1917562; GeneCards: CACTIN

Gene location (Human)
Chr.	Chromosome 19 (human)
Band	19p13.3	Start	3,610,645 bp
Band	19p13.3	End	3,626,815 bp

Gene location (Mouse)
Chr.	Chromosome 10 (mouse)
Band	10|10 C1	Start	81,156,937 bp
Band	10|10 C1	End	81,162,076 bp
RNA expression pattern
Bgee	Human / Mouse (ortholog); Top expressed in: sural nerve; granulocyte; right ovary; left ovary; right hemisphere of cerebellum; left uterine tube; apex of heart; body of uterus; gastrocnemius muscle; mucosa of transverse colon / Top expressed in: otic vesicle; interventricular septum; hand; abdominal wall; primitive streak; epiblast; gastrula; primary oocyte; mesenteric lymph nodes; thymus; More reference expression data
BioGPS	n/a
Gene ontology
Molecular function	protein binding; RNA binding
Cellular component	catalytic step 2 spliceosome; nucleoplasm; spliceosomal complex; extracellular exosome; nucleus; cytosol; nuclear speck; cytoplasm
Biological process	negative regulation of protein phosphorylation; mRNA splicing, via spliceosome; immune system process; negative regulation of type I interferon-mediated signaling pathway; cellular response to tumor necrosis factor; mRNA processing; negative regulation of interferon-beta production; negative regulation of lipopolysaccharide-mediated signaling pathway; multicellular organism development; negative regulation of interleukin-8 production; negative regulation of toll-like receptor signaling pathway; cellular response to interleukin-1; RNA splicing; negative regulation of tumor necrosis factor production; innate immune response; cellular response to lipopolysaccharide; negative regulation of NF-kappaB transcription factor activity
Sources:Amigo / QuickGO
Orthologs
Databases	NCBI: entry; OMA: entry
Species	Human	Mouse
Entrez	58509	70312
Ensembl	ENSG00000105298	ENSMUSG00000034889
UniProt	Q8WUQ7	Q9CS00
RefSeq (mRNA)	NM_001080543; NM_021231	NM_027381
RefSeq (protein)	NP_001074012; NP_067054	NP_081657
Location (UCSC)	Chr 19: 3.61 – 3.63 Mb	Chr 10: 81.16 – 81.16 Mb
PubMed search
- Wikidata
View/Edit Human	View/Edit Mouse

Cactin also known as renal carcinoma antigen NY-REN-24 is a protein that in humans is encoded by the CACTIN gene.

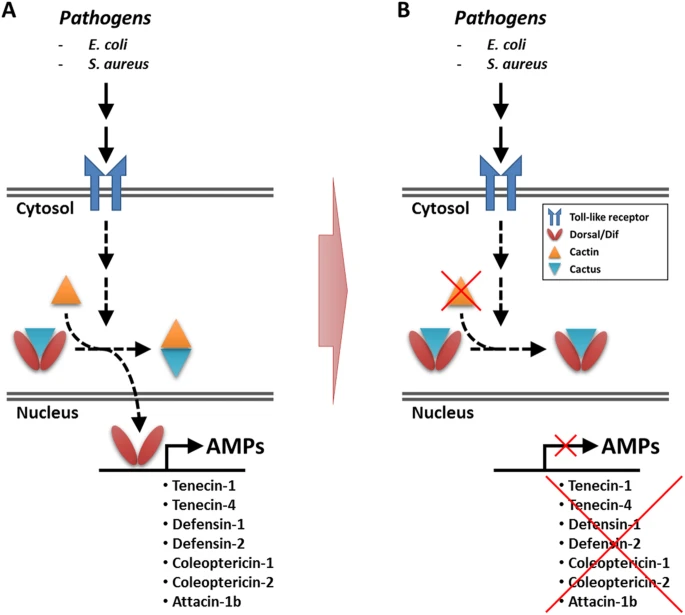
Upon activation of Toll signaling by Gram-positive and Gram-negative bacteria infection, Cactin in the cytosol binds to Cactus and mediates the release of Dif and Dorsal from Cactus, allowing their translocation into the nucleus and activation of AMP genes.

Cactin was originally identified in Drosophila (fruit flies). The cactin gene is product is involved in the regulation of the innate immune system. It acts as negative regulator of the toll-like receptor, Interferon regulatory factor (IRF) and the canonical NF-kappa-B signaling pathways.

== Structure ==
The full-length cactin protein length is 3,150 bp long and with an N-terminus from 356–547 residues and a domain in the C-terminal 731–855 residues.

== Species and tissue distributhion ==
This protein resides in many organs and tissues of all vertebrates, however, it has also been found in plants, protist, and fungi. The location that is highest in concentration of cactin gene is in the testis of males and in the spleen. The cactin gene in this specific area like the testis, enables RNA binding activity. This protein was also found to be involved in other process like cellular response from cytokines and negative signal transduction (negative feed back loops).

== In plants ==
In plants, the cactcin is associated with SR proteins localized in nuclear speckles. Plant and human cells share the same spliceosomal proteins, which involved the removal of introns in order to form mature messenger RNA.
