= PPIG =

PPIG may refer to:

- PPIG (gene)
- Psychology of Programming Interest Group
