= CCAR =

CCAR may refer to:

- Central Conference of American Rabbis
- Colorado Center for Astrodynamics Research
- CCAir, ticker symbol CCAR
- Comprehensive Capital Analysis and Review, a bank stress test conducted each year in the USA
- Continuously compounded annual return via interest payments on lent or deposited funds
- Cisco Certified Architect (CCAr) is the highest-level certification Cisco offers.
- Close Combat Assault Ration

Also, CCAR1:

- 'Cell division cycle and apoptosis regulator protein 1' is a protein that in humans is encoded by the CCAR1 gene.
