= TRA2B =

Protein-coding gene in the species Homo sapiens

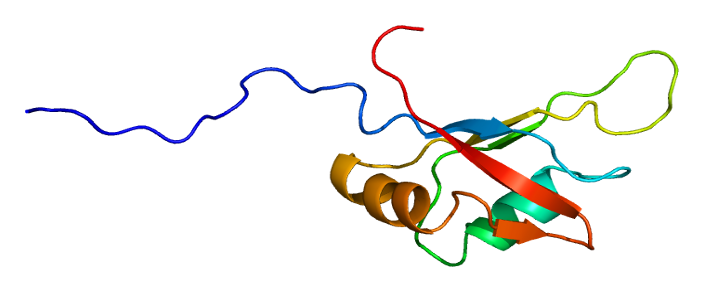

Identifiers
- Aliases: TRA2B, Htra2-beta, PPP1R156, SFRS10, SRFS10, TRA2-BETA, TRAN2B, transformer 2 beta homolog (Drosophila), transformer 2 beta homolog
- External IDs: OMIM: 602719; MGI: 106016; GeneCards: TRA2B
Available structures
PDB	Ortholog search: PDBe RCSB
PDB	List of PDB id codes 2CQC, 2KXN, 2RRA, 2RRB

Gene location (Human)
Chr.	Chromosome 3 (human)
Band	3q27.2	Start	185,914,558 bp
Band	3q27.2	End	185,938,103 bp

Gene location (Mouse)
Chr.	Chromosome 16 (mouse)
Band	16 B1|16 13.18 cM	Start	22,063,299 bp
Band	16 B1|16 13.18 cM	End	22,084,755 bp
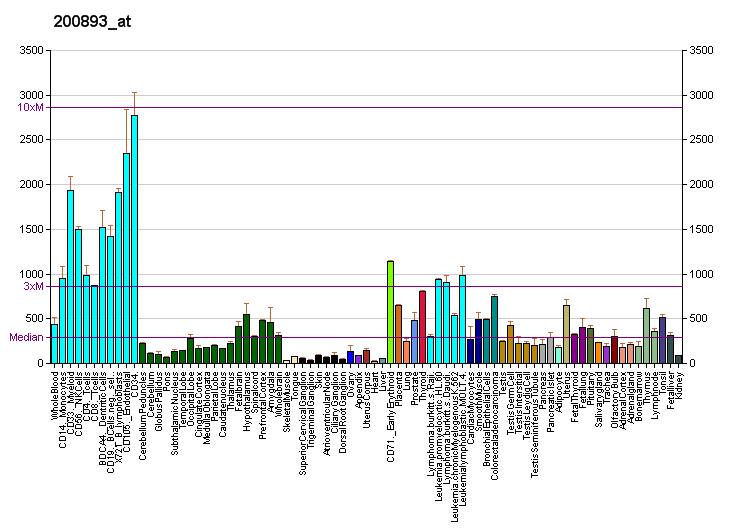

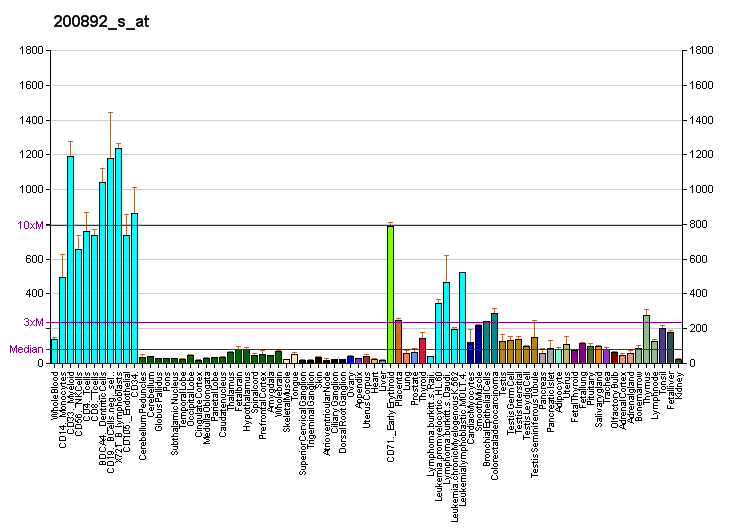

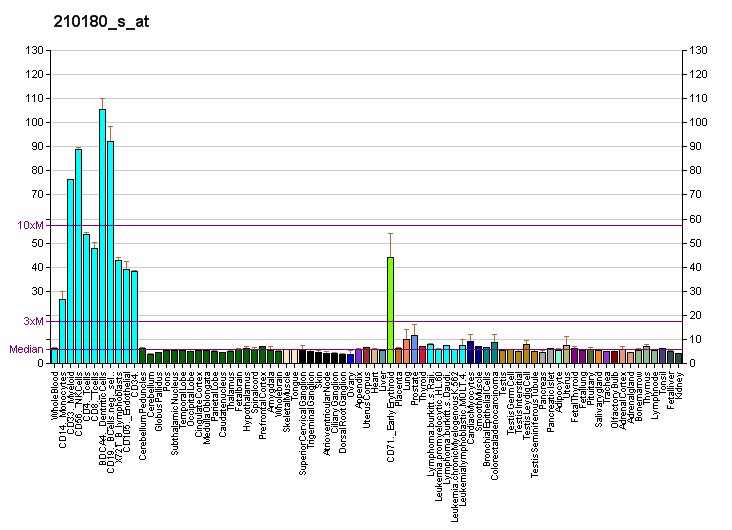
RNA expression pattern
Bgee	Human / Mouse (ortholog); Top expressed in: germinal epithelium; parietal pleura; ventricular zone; embryo; visceral pleura; endothelial cell; ganglionic eminence; amniotic fluid; tibia; epithelium of nasopharynx / Top expressed in: tail of embryo; genital tubercle; ventricular zone; yolk sac; embryo; embryo; spermatocyte; neural layer of retina; morula; blastocyst; More reference expression data
BioGPS	More reference expression data
Gene ontology
Molecular function	nucleic acid binding; mRNA binding; protein binding; poly-purine tract binding; RNA binding; protein domain specific binding; pre-mRNA binding; identical protein binding
Cellular component	nucleus; nuclear inner membrane; nucleoplasm; spliceosomal complex; ribonucleoprotein complex
Biological process	RNA splicing, via transesterification reactions; RNA splicing; cerebral cortex regionalization; mRNA processing; negative regulation of mRNA splicing, via spliceosome; embryonic brain development; mRNA splicing, via spliceosome; positive regulation of mRNA splicing, via spliceosome; regulation of alternative mRNA splicing, via spliceosome; regulation of RNA splicing; protein complex oligomerization; cellular response to glucose stimulus
Sources:Amigo / QuickGO
Orthologs
Databases	NCBI: entry; OMA: entry
Species	Human	Mouse
Entrez	6434	20462
Ensembl	ENSG00000136527	ENSMUSG00000022858
UniProt	P62995	P62996
RefSeq (mRNA)	NM_001243879; NM_004593	NM_009186; NM_001330554; NM_001330555
RefSeq (protein)	NP_001230808; NP_004584	NP_001317483; NP_001317484; NP_033212
Location (UCSC)	Chr 3: 185.91 – 185.94 Mb	Chr 16: 22.06 – 22.08 Mb
PubMed search
- Wikidata
View/Edit Human	View/Edit Mouse

Transformer-2 protein homolog beta, also known as TRA2B previously known as splicing factor, arginine/serine-rich 10 (transformer 2 homolog, Drosophila) (SFRS10), is a protein that in humans is encoded by the TRA2B gene.

TRA2B contains a poison exon whose inclusion is autoregulated by TRA2B protein. Proper regulation of poison exon inclusion in TRA2B is important for T cell fate.

== Interactions ==
TRA2B has been shown to interact with RBMX.
