= PRP4K =

Protein-coding gene in the species Homo sapiens

An Error has occurred retrieving Wikidata item for infobox Serine/threonine-protein kinase PRP4 homolog is an enzyme that in humans is encoded by the PRP4K gene. The gene was previously known as PRPF4B.

Pre-mRNA splicing occurs in two sequential transesterification steps, and the protein encoded by this gene is thought to be involved in pre-mRNA splicing and in signal transduction. This protein belongs to a kinase family that includes serine/arginine-rich protein-specific kinases and cyclin-dependent kinases (CDKs). This protein is regarded as a CDK-like kinase (Clk) with homology to mitogen-activated protein kinases (MAPKs).

== Interactions ==
PRP4K has been shown to interact with Pinin.
