= SRRM2 =

Protein-coding gene in the species Homo sapiens

Identifiers
- Aliases: SRRM2, 300-KD, CWF21, Cwc21, SRL300, SRm300, HSPC075, serine/arginine repetitive matrix 2
- External IDs: OMIM: 606032; MGI: 1923206; GeneCards: SRRM2

Gene location (Human)
Chr.	Chromosome 16 (human)
Band	16p13.3	Start	2,752,626 bp
Band	16p13.3	End	2,772,538 bp

Gene location (Mouse)
Chr.	Chromosome 17 (mouse)
Band	17|17 A3.3	Start	24,009,506 bp
Band	17|17 A3.3	End	24,043,715 bp
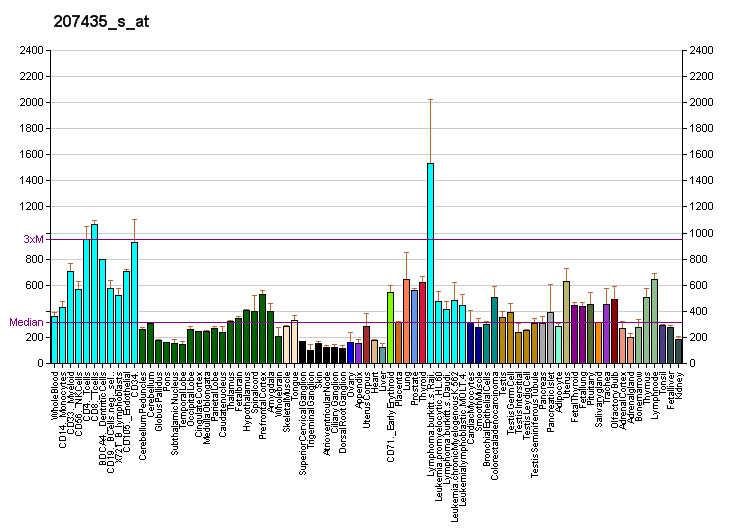

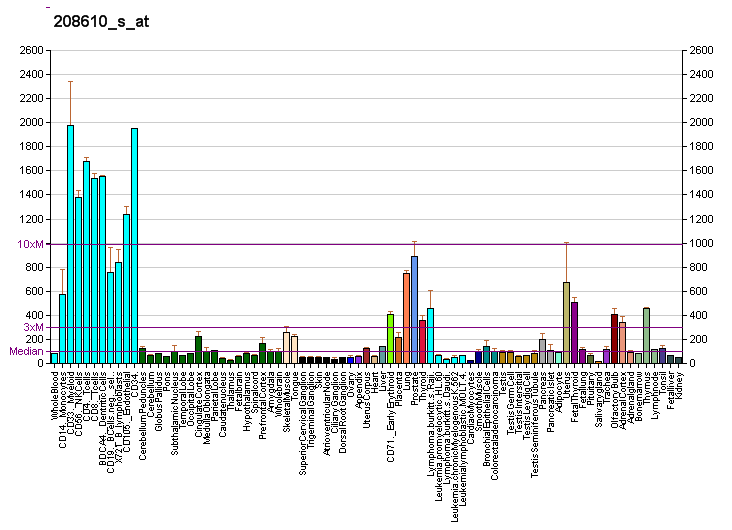
RNA expression pattern
Bgee	Human / Mouse (ortholog); Top expressed in: right uterine tube; right hemisphere of cerebellum; right lobe of thyroid gland; left lobe of thyroid gland; body of uterus; canal of the cervix; tibial nerve; epithelium of colon; fundus; body of stomach / Top expressed in: Rostral migratory stream; otolith organ; utricle; genital tubercle; tail of embryo; ventromedial nucleus; neural layer of retina; mammillary body; cerebellar cortex; inferior colliculi; More reference expression data
BioGPS	More reference expression data
Gene ontology
Molecular function	C2H2 zinc finger domain binding; protein N-terminus binding; RNA binding
Cellular component	Cajal body; nuclear speck; catalytic step 2 spliceosome; spliceosomal complex; nucleus; nucleoplasm; U2-type catalytic step 2 spliceosome; U2-type precatalytic spliceosome
Biological process	mRNA processing; RNA splicing; mRNA splicing, via spliceosome
Sources:Amigo / QuickGO
Orthologs
Databases	NCBI: entry; OMA: entry
Species	Human	Mouse
Entrez	23524	75956
Ensembl	ENSG00000167978	ENSMUSG00000039218
UniProt	Q9UQ35	Q8BTI8
RefSeq (mRNA)	NM_016333	NM_175229; NM_001368687
RefSeq (protein)	NP_057417	NP_780438; NP_001355616
Location (UCSC)	Chr 16: 2.75 – 2.77 Mb	Chr 17: 24.01 – 24.04 Mb
PubMed search
- Wikidata
View/Edit Human	View/Edit Mouse

Serine/arginine repetitive matrix protein 2 is a protein that in humans is encoded by the SRRM2 gene.

== Interactions ==
SRRM2 has been shown to interact with Pinin.
