= Pinin =

Protein-coding gene in the species Homo sapiens

PNN

Identifiers
- Aliases: PNN, DRS, DRSP, SDK3, memA, Pinin, pinin, desmosome associated protein
- External IDs: OMIM: 603154; MGI: 1100514; HomoloGene: 37656; GeneCards: PNN; OMA:PNN - orthologs

Gene location (Human)
Chr.	Chromosome 14 (human)
Band	14q21.1	Start	39,175,183 bp
Band	14q21.1	End	39,183,220 bp

Gene location (Mouse)
Chr.	Chromosome 12 (mouse)
Band	12 C1|12 26.0 cM	Start	59,113,670 bp
Band	12 C1|12 26.0 cM	End	59,120,784 bp
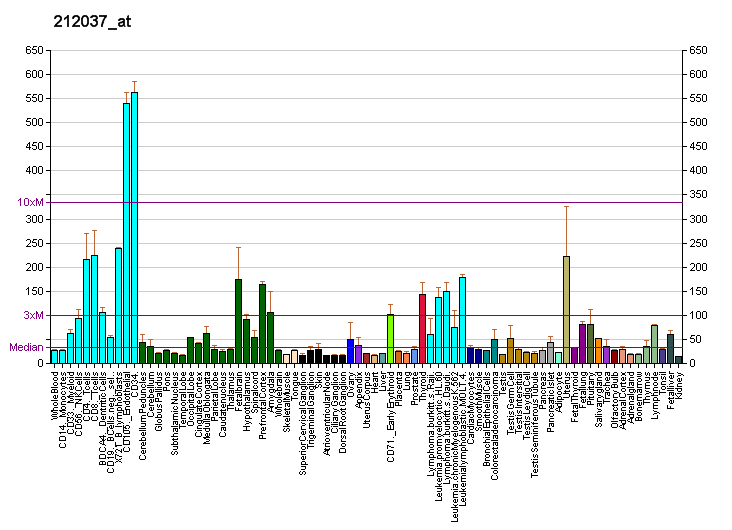

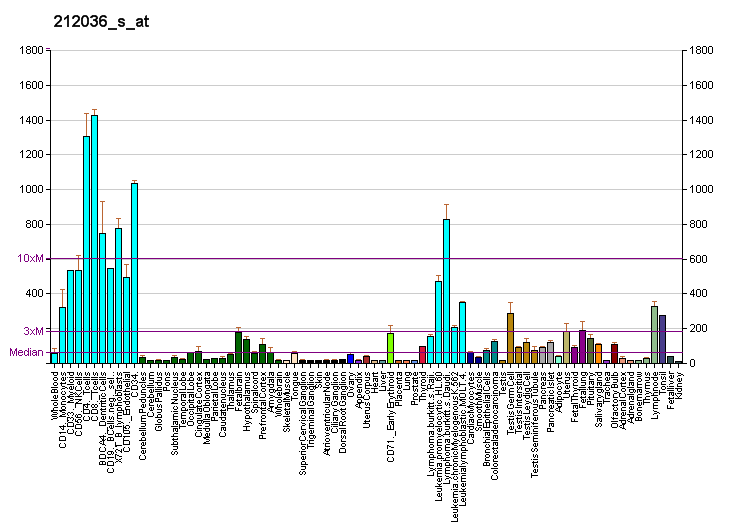
RNA expression pattern
Bgee	Human / Mouse (ortholog); Top expressed in: tendon of biceps brachii; corpus epididymis; sural nerve; epithelium of nasopharynx; ventricular zone; pylorus; internal globus pallidus; cardia; seminal vesicula; right uterine tube / Top expressed in: medullary collecting duct; saccule; tail of embryo; neural layer of retina; renal corpuscle; otic placode; genital tubercle; fossa; primitive streak; condyle; More reference expression data
BioGPS	More reference expression data
Gene ontology
Molecular function	structural molecule activity; DNA binding; RNA binding; protein binding
Cellular component	intermediate filament; cell junction; nucleus; cell-cell junction; membrane; desmosome; exon-exon junction complex; plasma membrane; catalytic step 2 spliceosome; spliceosomal complex; nuclear speck
Biological process	mRNA splicing, via spliceosome; transcription, DNA-templated; RNA splicing; mRNA processing; regulation of transcription, DNA-templated; cell adhesion
Sources:Amigo / QuickGO
Orthologs
Species	Human	Mouse
Entrez	5411	18949
Ensembl	ENSG00000100941	ENSMUSG00000020994
UniProt	Q9H307	O35691
RefSeq (mRNA)	NM_002687	NM_008891
RefSeq (protein)	NP_002678	NP_032917
Location (UCSC)	Chr 14: 39.18 – 39.18 Mb	Chr 12: 59.11 – 59.12 Mb
PubMed search
- Wikidata
View/Edit Human	View/Edit Mouse

Pinin is a protein that in humans is encoded by the PNN gene.

== Interactions ==
Pinin has been shown to interact with Keratin 8, Keratin 18, Keratin 19, CTBP1, RNPS1, PRPF4B, SFRS4, PPIG, SRRM2 and SFRS18.
