= PNISR =

Protein-coding gene in the species Homo sapiens

Identifiers
- Aliases: PNISR, C6orf111, HSPC306, SFRS18, SRrp130, bA98I9.2, PNN-interacting serine/arginine-rich protein, PNN interacting serine and arginine rich protein
- External IDs: OMIM: 616653; MGI: 1913875; HomoloGene: 32802; GeneCards: PNISR; OMA:PNISR - orthologs

Gene location (Human)
| Chr. | Chromosome 6 (human) |
| Band | 6q16.2 | Start | 99,397,629 bp |
| Band | 6q16.2 | End | 99,425,331 bp |

Gene location (Mouse)
| Chr. | Chromosome 4 (mouse) |
| Band | 4|4 A3 | Start | 21,847,583 bp |
| Band | 4|4 A3 | End | 21,876,475 bp |
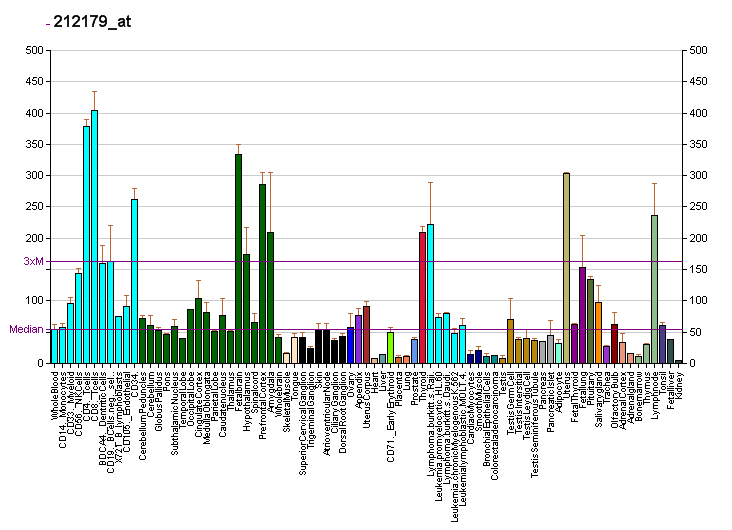

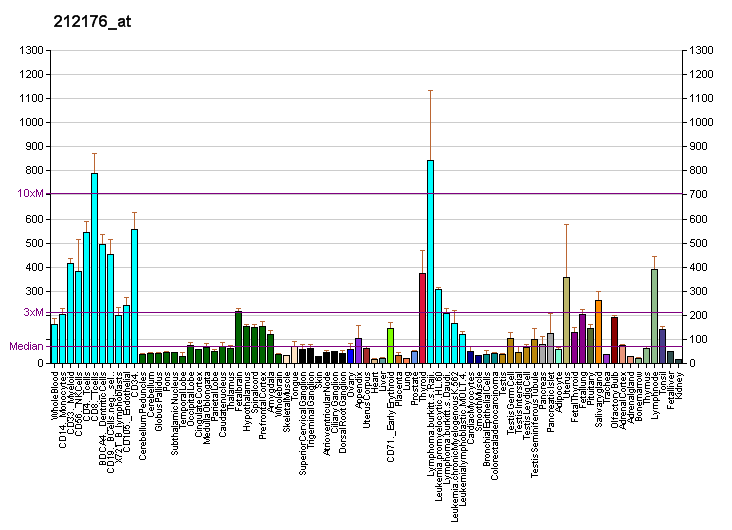
RNA expression pattern
| Bgee | Human / Mouse (ortholog); Top expressed in: right hemisphere of cerebellum; sural nerve; right uterine tube; left ovary; anterior pituitary; left lobe of thyroid gland; right ovary; body of uterus; right lobe of thyroid gland; Achilles tendon / Top expressed in: hand; lobe of cerebellum; cerebellar vermis; neural layer of retina; genital tubercle; medullary collecting duct; superior colliculus; tail of embryo; superior cervical ganglion; Rostral migratory stream; More reference expression data |
| BioGPS | More reference expression data |
Orthologs
| Species | Human | Mouse |
| Entrez | 25957 | 66625 |
| Ensembl | ENSG00000132424 | ENSMUSG00000028248 |
| UniProt | Q8TF01 | A2AJT4 |
| RefSeq (mRNA) | NM_015491; NM_032870; NM_001322405; NM_001322406; NM_001322408 NM_001322410; NM_001322412; NM_001322413; NM_001322414; NM_001322415; NM_001322416; NM_001322417; NM_001322418; NM_001322419 | NM_025669; NM_001369189; NM_001369190; NM_001369191 |
| RefSeq (protein) | NP_001309334; NP_001309335; NP_001309337; NP_001309339; NP_001309341 NP_001309342; NP_001309343; NP_001309344; NP_001309345; NP_001309346; NP_001309347; NP_001309348; NP_056306; NP_116259 | NP_079945; NP_001356118; NP_001356119; NP_001356120 |
| Location (UCSC) | Chr 6: 99.4 – 99.43 Mb | Chr 4: 21.85 – 21.88 Mb |
| PubMed search |
- Wikidata
| View/Edit Human | View/Edit Mouse |

Splicing factor, arginine/serine-rich 18 is a protein that in humans is encoded by the SFRS18 gene.

== Interactions ==
SFRS18 has been shown to interact with Pinin.
