= SFRS5 =

Protein-coding gene in the species Homo sapiens

SRSF5

Identifiers
- Aliases: SRSF5, HRS, SFRS5, SRP40, serine/arginine-rich splicing factor 5, serine and arginine rich splicing factor 5
- External IDs: OMIM: 600914; MGI: 98287; GeneCards: SRSF5

Gene location (Human)
Chr.	Chromosome 14 (human)
Band	14q24.1	Start	69,726,900 bp
Band	14q24.1	End	69,772,005 bp

Gene location (Mouse)
Chr.	Chromosome 12 (mouse)
Band	12|12 D1	Start	80,992,278 bp
Band	12|12 D1	End	80,997,281 bp
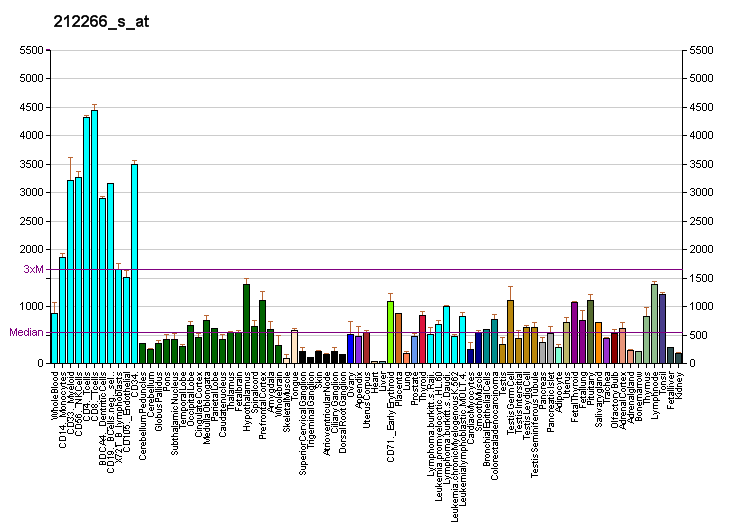

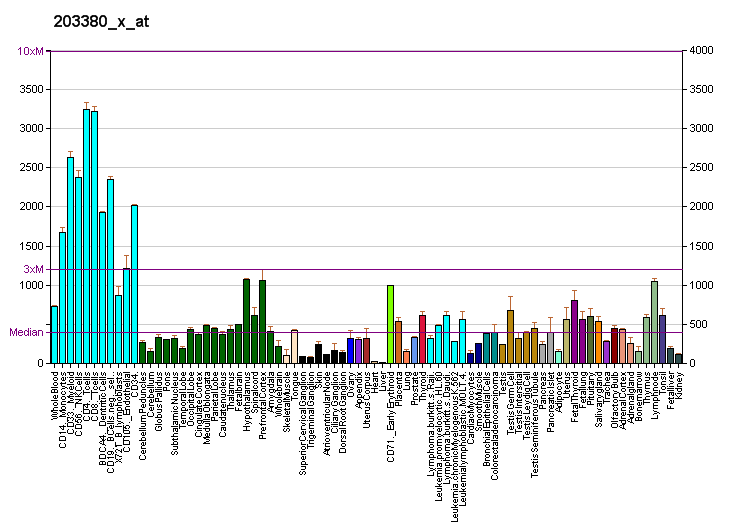
RNA expression pattern
Bgee	Human / Mouse (ortholog); Top expressed in: right uterine tube; right hemisphere of cerebellum; anterior pituitary; left lobe of thyroid gland; left ovary; right lobe of thyroid gland; gastric mucosa; Achilles tendon; granulocyte; right ovary / Top expressed in: neural layer of retina; olfactory bulb; ovary; tail of embryo; cerebellum; granulocyte; cerebellar cortex; lens; genital tubercle; lung; More reference expression data
BioGPS	More reference expression data
Gene ontology
Molecular function	protein binding; nucleic acid binding; protein kinase B binding; RNA binding
Cellular component	nucleoplasm; nucleolus; nucleus; cytosol; nuclear speck
Biological process	mRNA splicing, via spliceosome; termination of RNA polymerase II transcription; mRNA processing; mRNA export from nucleus; regulation of cell cycle; liver regeneration; mRNA splice site selection; cellular response to insulin stimulus; mRNA 3'-end processing; liver development; RNA splicing; response to insulin; RNA export from nucleus; positive regulation of RNA splicing; regulation of alternative mRNA splicing, via spliceosome; mRNA cis splicing, via spliceosome
Sources:Amigo / QuickGO
Orthologs
Databases	NCBI: entry; OMA: entry
Species	Human	Mouse
Entrez	6430	20384
Ensembl	ENSG00000100650	ENSMUSG00000021134
UniProt	Q13243	O35326
RefSeq (mRNA)	NM_001039465; NM_006925; NM_001320214	NM_001079694; NM_001079695; NM_009159; NM_001347415; NM_001347416
RefSeq (protein)	NP_001034554; NP_001307143; NP_008856	NP_001073162; NP_001073163; NP_001334344; NP_001334345; NP_033185
Location (UCSC)	Chr 14: 69.73 – 69.77 Mb	Chr 12: 80.99 – 81 Mb
PubMed search
- Wikidata
View/Edit Human	View/Edit Mouse

Splicing factor, arginine/serine-rich 5 is a protein that in humans is encoded by the SFRS5 gene.
