= RBMX =

Protein-coding gene in humans

Identifiers
- Aliases: RBMX, HNRNPG, HNRPG, RBMXP1, RBMXRT, RNMX, hnRNP-G, MRXS11, RNA binding motif protein, X-linked, RNA binding motif protein X-linked
- External IDs: OMIM: 300199; MGI: 1343044; GeneCards: RBMX
Available structures
PDB	Ortholog search: PDBe RCSB
PDB	List of PDB id codes 2MB0, 2MKS

Gene location (Human)
Chr.	X chromosome (human)
Band	Xq26.3	Start	136,848,004 bp
Band	Xq26.3	End	136,880,764 bp

Gene location (Mouse)
Chr.	X chromosome (mouse)
Band	X|X A6	Start	56,428,890 bp
Band	X|X A6	End	56,438,396 bp
RNA expression pattern
Bgee	Human / Mouse (ortholog); Top expressed in: ventricular zone; ganglionic eminence; left ovary; Achilles tendon; right ovary; canal of the cervix; smooth muscle tissue; body of uterus; mucosa of ileum; rectum / Top expressed in: saccule; genital tubercle; Rostral migratory stream; ventricular zone; ganglionic eminence; tail of embryo; otic vesicle; otic placode; neural layer of retina; olfactory bulb; More reference expression data
BioGPS	n/a
Gene ontology
Molecular function	protein binding; nucleic acid binding; mRNA binding; RNA binding; chromatin binding; protein domain specific binding; identical protein binding; single-stranded RNA binding; RNA polymerase II cis-regulatory region sequence-specific DNA binding
Cellular component	catalytic step 2 spliceosome; membrane; supraspliceosomal complex; nucleoplasm; spliceosomal complex; extracellular exosome; nucleus; extracellular space; ribonucleoprotein complex
Biological process	mRNA splicing, via spliceosome; positive regulation of mRNA splicing, via spliceosome; mRNA processing; transcription by RNA polymerase II; regulation of alternative mRNA splicing, via spliceosome; transcription, DNA-templated; negative regulation of mRNA splicing, via spliceosome; membrane protein ectodomain proteolysis; osteoblast differentiation; cellular response to interleukin-1; protein homooligomerization; RNA splicing; positive regulation of transcription by RNA polymerase II; RNA metabolic process; protein complex oligomerization; mRNA splice site selection; positive regulation of transcription, DNA-templated
Sources:Amigo / QuickGO
Orthologs
Databases	NCBI: entry; OMA: entry
Species	Human	Mouse
Entrez	27316	19655
Ensembl	ENSG00000147274	ENSMUSG00000031134
UniProt	P38159	Q9WV02
RefSeq (mRNA)	NM_001164803; NM_002139	NM_001166623; NM_011252
RefSeq (protein)	NP_001158275; NP_002130	NP_001160095; NP_035382
Location (UCSC)	Chr X: 136.85 – 136.88 Mb	Chr X: 56.43 – 56.44 Mb
PubMed search
- Wikidata
View/Edit Human	View/Edit Mouse

Heterogeneous nuclear ribonucleoprotein G is a protein that in humans is encoded by the RBMX gene.

== Function ==
This gene belongs to the RBMY gene family which includes candidate Y chromosome spermatogenesis genes. This gene, an active X chromosome homolog of the Y chromosome RBMY gene, is widely expressed whereas the RBMY gene evolved a male-specific function in spermatogenesis. Pseudogenes of this gene, found on chromosomes 1, 4, 9, 11, and 6, were likely derived by retrotransposition from the original gene. Alternatively spliced transcript variants encoding different isoforms have been identified but their biological nature has not been determined.

== Interactions ==
RBMX has been shown to interact with SFRS10 and CDC5L.
