= SFRS7 =

Protein-coding gene in the species Homo sapiens

SRSF7
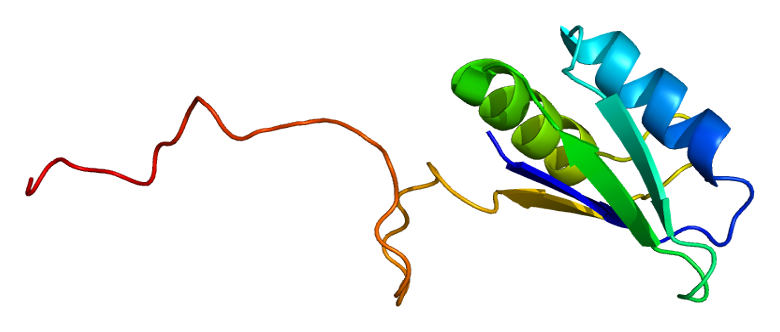

Identifiers
- Aliases: SRSF7, 9G8, AAG3, SFRS7, serine/arginine-rich splicing factor 7, serine and arginine rich splicing factor 7
- External IDs: OMIM: 600572; MGI: 1926232; GeneCards: SRSF7
Available structures
PDB	Ortholog search: PDBe RCSB
PDB	List of PDB id codes 2HVZ

Gene location (Human)
Chr.	Chromosome 2 (human)
Band	2p22.1	Start	38,743,599 bp
Band	2p22.1	End	38,751,494 bp

Gene location (Mouse)
Chr.	Chromosome 17 (mouse)
Band	17|17 E3	Start	80,507,509 bp
Band	17|17 E3	End	80,514,736 bp
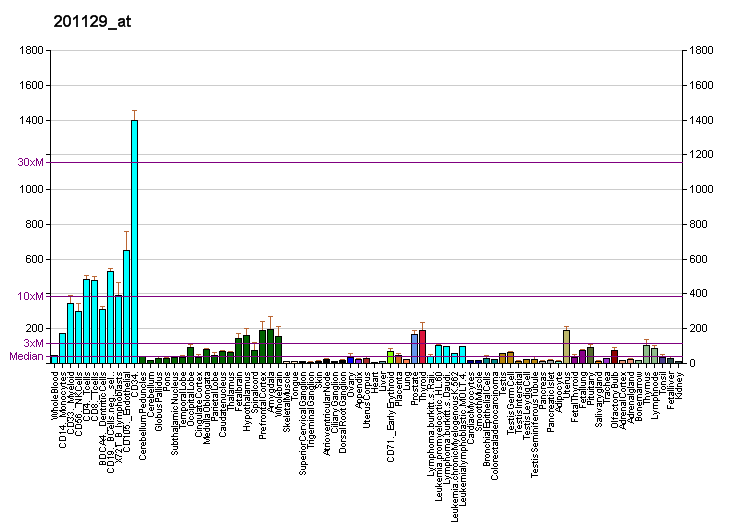

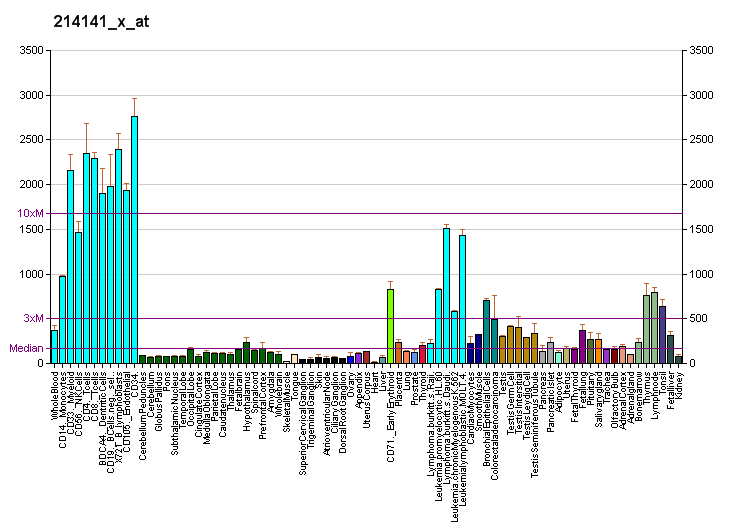

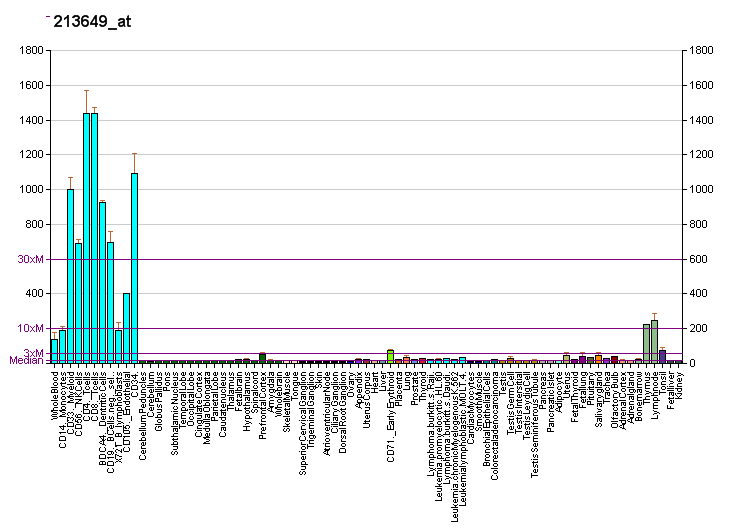
RNA expression pattern
Bgee	Human / Mouse (ortholog); Top expressed in: ganglionic eminence; granulocyte; ventricular zone; left uterine tube; lymph node; gastric mucosa; peritoneum; monocyte; gonad; appendix / Top expressed in: genital tubercle; abdominal wall; maxillary prominence; mandibular prominence; medullary collecting duct; tail of embryo; superior cervical ganglion; medial ganglionic eminence; vas deferens; Gonadal ridge; More reference expression data
BioGPS	More reference expression data
Gene ontology
Molecular function	zinc ion binding; metal ion binding; protein binding; nucleic acid binding; RNA binding; protein domain specific binding
Cellular component	cytoplasm; nucleoplasm; extracellular exosome; nucleus; nuclear speck
Biological process	mRNA splicing, via spliceosome; termination of RNA polymerase II transcription; mRNA transport; mRNA processing; mRNA export from nucleus; negative regulation of mRNA splicing, via spliceosome; mRNA 3'-end processing; RNA export from nucleus; RNA splicing; cellular response to leukemia inhibitory factor; transport; regulation of alternative mRNA splicing, via spliceosome; mRNA cis splicing, via spliceosome
Sources:Amigo / QuickGO
Orthologs
Databases	NCBI: entry; OMA: entry
Species	Human	Mouse
Entrez	6432	225027
Ensembl	ENSG00000115875	ENSMUSG00000024097
UniProt	Q16629	Q8BL97
RefSeq (mRNA)	NM_001031684; NM_001195446; NM_006276; NM_001363802	NM_001195485; NM_001195486; NM_001195487; NM_146083; NM_001360435
RefSeq (protein)	NP_001026854; NP_001182375; NP_001350731	NP_001182414; NP_001182415; NP_001182416; NP_666195; NP_001347364
Location (UCSC)	Chr 2: 38.74 – 38.75 Mb	Chr 17: 80.51 – 80.51 Mb
PubMed search
- Wikidata
View/Edit Human	View/Edit Mouse

Serine/arginine-rich splicing factor 7 (SRSF7) also known as splicing factor, arginine/serine-rich 7 (SFRS7) or splicing factor 9G8 is a protein that in humans is encoded by the SRSF7 gene.

== Function ==
The protein encoded by this gene is a member of the serine/arginine (SR)-rich family of pre-mRNA splicing factors, which constitute part of the spliceosome. Each of these factors contains an RNA recognition motif (RRM) for binding RNA and an RS domain for binding other proteins. The RS domain is rich in serine and arginine residues and facilitates interaction between different SR splicing factors. In addition to being critical for mRNA splicing, the SR proteins have also been shown to be involved in mRNA export from the nucleus and in translation.
