= SFRS6 =

Protein-coding gene in the species Homo sapiens

SRSF6

Identifiers
- Aliases: SRSF6, B52, HEL-S-91, SFRS6, SRP55, serine/arginine-rich splicing factor 6, serine and arginine rich splicing factor 6
- External IDs: OMIM: 601944; MGI: 1915246; GeneCards: SRSF6

Gene location (Human)
Chr.	Chromosome 20 (human)
Band	20q13.11	Start	43,457,893 bp
Band	20q13.11	End	43,466,046 bp

Gene location (Mouse)
Chr.	Chromosome 2 (mouse)
Band	2 H2|2 83.87 cM	Start	162,773,448 bp
Band	2 H2|2 83.87 cM	End	162,779,041 bp
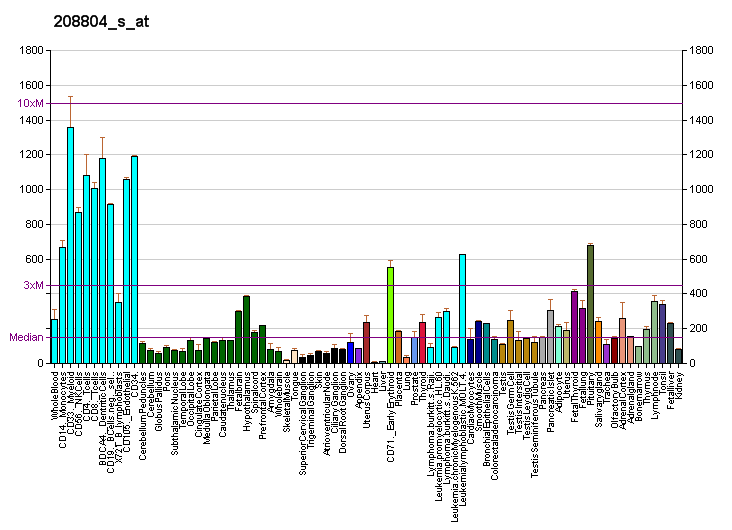

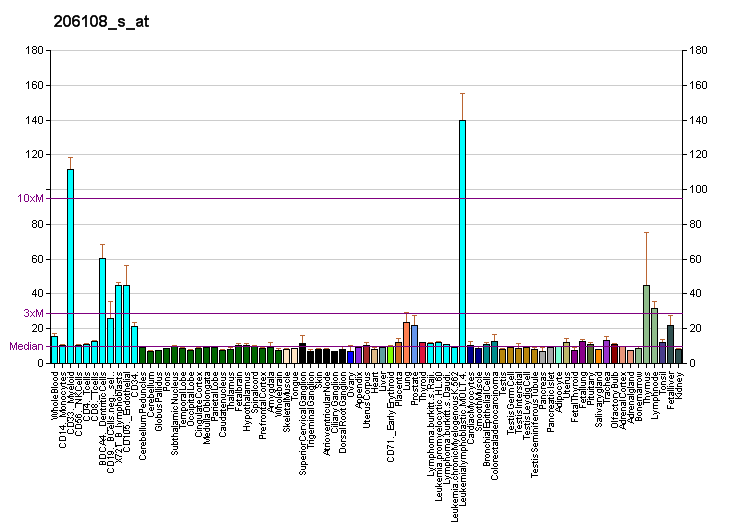
RNA expression pattern
Bgee	Human / Mouse (ortholog); Top expressed in: right uterine tube; body of pancreas; right lobe of thyroid gland; right adrenal cortex; right ovary; left lobe of thyroid gland; left ovary; germinal epithelium; ventricular zone; left adrenal gland / Top expressed in: medullary collecting duct; abdominal wall; renal corpuscle; endocardial cushion; somite; superior cervical ganglion; epiblast; ventricular zone; dermis; Gonadal ridge; More reference expression data
BioGPS	More reference expression data
Gene ontology
Molecular function	protein binding; RNA binding; nucleic acid binding; pre-mRNA binding
Cellular component	nuclear speck; nucleus; nucleoplasm
Biological process	mRNA splicing, via spliceosome; termination of RNA polymerase II transcription; negative regulation of keratinocyte differentiation; positive regulation of epithelial cell proliferation involved in lung morphogenesis; mRNA processing; negative regulation of cell death; regulation of alternative mRNA splicing, via spliceosome; mRNA export from nucleus; negative regulation of mRNA splicing, via spliceosome; regulation of wound healing; mRNA splice site selection; regulation of keratinocyte proliferation; alternative mRNA splicing, via spliceosome; mRNA 3'-end processing; negative regulation of gene expression; RNA splicing; response to insulin; RNA export from nucleus; negative regulation of type B pancreatic cell apoptotic process; mRNA cis splicing, via spliceosome
Sources:Amigo / QuickGO
Orthologs
Databases	NCBI: entry; OMA: entry
Species	Human	Mouse
Entrez	6431	67996
Ensembl	ENSG00000124193	ENSMUSG00000016921
UniProt	Q13247	Q3TWW8
RefSeq (mRNA)	NM_006275	NM_026499
RefSeq (protein)	NP_006266	NP_080775
Location (UCSC)	Chr 20: 43.46 – 43.47 Mb	Chr 2: 162.77 – 162.78 Mb
PubMed search
- Wikidata
View/Edit Human	View/Edit Mouse

Splicing factor, arginine/serine-rich 6 is a protein that in humans is encoded by the SFRS6 gene.

== Function ==
The protein encoded by this gene is involved in mRNA splicing and may play a role in site selection in alternative splicing. The encoded nuclear protein belongs to the splicing factor SR family and has been shown to bind with and modulate another member of the family, SFRS12.
