= Tra (gene) =

Gene

Transformer

Identifiers
- Organism: Drosophila melanogaster
- Symbol: tra
- Alt. symbols: CG16724; Dmel\CG16724; Dmtra
- Entrez: 39849
- RefSeq (mRNA): NM_079390.3
- RefSeq (Prot): NP_524114.1
- UniProt: P11596

Other data
- Chromosome: 3L: 16.58 - 16.58 Mb
Search for
- Structures: Swiss-model
- Domains: InterPro

Fruit fly transformer

Identifiers
- Symbol: Transformer
- Pfam: PF06495
- InterPro: IPR010519
Available protein structures:
- Pfam: structures / ECOD
- PDB: RCSB PDB; PDBe; PDBj
- PDBsum: structure summary

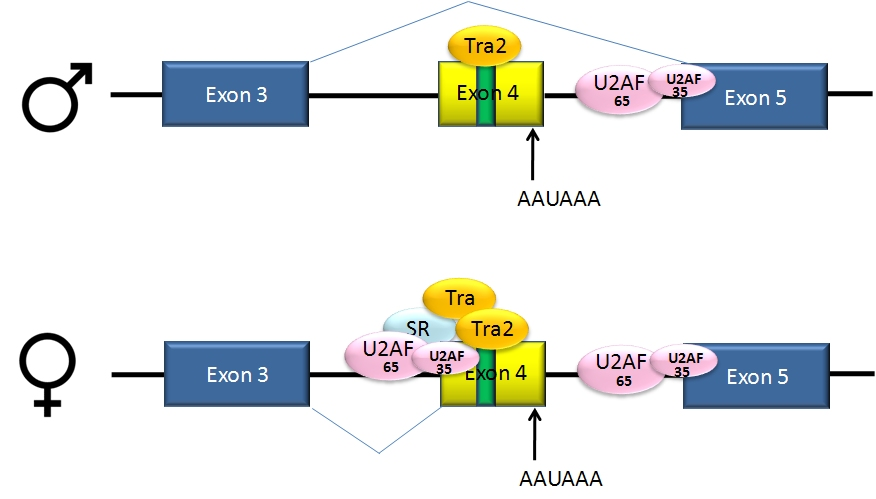
Alternative splicing of dsx pre-mRNA. Tra2 is a transformer protein; the gene is involved in the regulation of sex determination in many insects.

Transformer-2

Identifiers
- Organism: Drosophila melanogaster
- Symbol: tra2
- UniProt: P19018
Search for
- Structures: Swiss-model
- Domains: InterPro

Female-specific protein transformer is a protein that in Drosophila melanogaster is encoded by the tra gene. Unlike the related tra2 protein, it is only produced in females.

The transformer protein controls female somatic sexual differentiation. The protein contains an RNA recognition motif. It controls the alternative splicing of the fly sex determination gene doublesex.
