= SFRS4 =

Protein-coding gene in humans

SRSF4

Identifiers
- Aliases: SRSF4, SFRS4, SRP75, serine/arginine-rich splicing factor 4, serine and arginine rich splicing factor 4
- External IDs: OMIM: 601940; MGI: 1890577; GeneCards: SRSF4

Gene location (Human)
| Chr. | Chromosome 1 (human) |
| Band | 1p35.3 | Start | 29,147,743 bp |
| Band | 1p35.3 | End | 29,181,900 bp |

Gene location (Mouse)
| Chr. | Chromosome 4 (mouse) |
| Band | 4|4 D2.3 | Start | 131,873,617 bp |
| Band | 4|4 D2.3 | End | 131,901,706 bp |
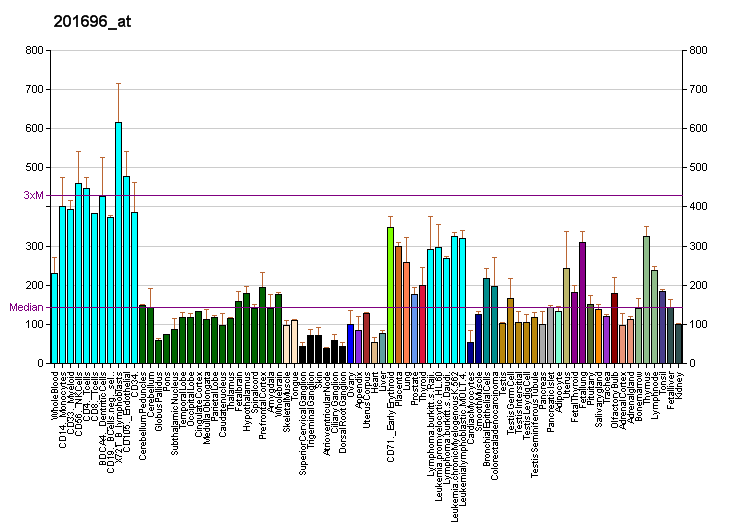
RNA expression pattern
| Bgee | Human / Mouse (ortholog); Top expressed in: sural nerve; middle frontal gyrus; paraflocculus of cerebellum; ventricular zone; body of uterus; canal of the cervix; gastric mucosa; muscle layer of sigmoid colon; left ovary; right ovary / Top expressed in: neural layer of retina; ventricular zone; ascending aorta; aortic valve; primitive streak; ganglionic eminence; somite; mandibular prominence; maxillary prominence; retinal pigment epithelium; More reference expression data |
| BioGPS | More reference expression data |
Gene ontology
| Molecular function | sequence-specific mRNA binding; nucleic acid binding; protein binding; RNA binding; nucleotide binding |
| Cellular component | nucleus; nucleoplasm; nuclear speck |
| Biological process | RNA splicing, via transesterification reactions; mRNA splicing, via spliceosome; termination of RNA polymerase II transcription; mRNA processing; negative regulation of mRNA splicing, via spliceosome; mRNA 3'-end processing; mRNA export from nucleus; RNA splicing; RNA export from nucleus; response to insulin; regulation of alternative mRNA splicing, via spliceosome; mRNA cis splicing, via spliceosome |
Sources:Amigo / QuickGO
Orthologs
| Databases | NCBI: entry; OMA: entry |
| Species | Human | Mouse |
| Entrez | 6429 | 57317 |
| Ensembl | ENSG00000116350 | ENSMUSG00000028911 |
| UniProt | Q08170 | Q8VE97 |
| RefSeq (mRNA) | NM_005626 | NM_020587 |
| RefSeq (protein) | NP_005617 | n/a |
| Location (UCSC) | Chr 1: 29.15 – 29.18 Mb | Chr 4: 131.87 – 131.9 Mb |
| PubMed search |
- Wikidata
| View/Edit Human | View/Edit Mouse |

Splicing factor, arginine/serine-rich 4 is a protein that in humans is encoded by the SFRS4 gene.

== Interactions ==
SFRS4 has been shown to interact with Pinin.
