= SFRS9 =

Protein-coding gene in the species Homo sapiens

SRSF9
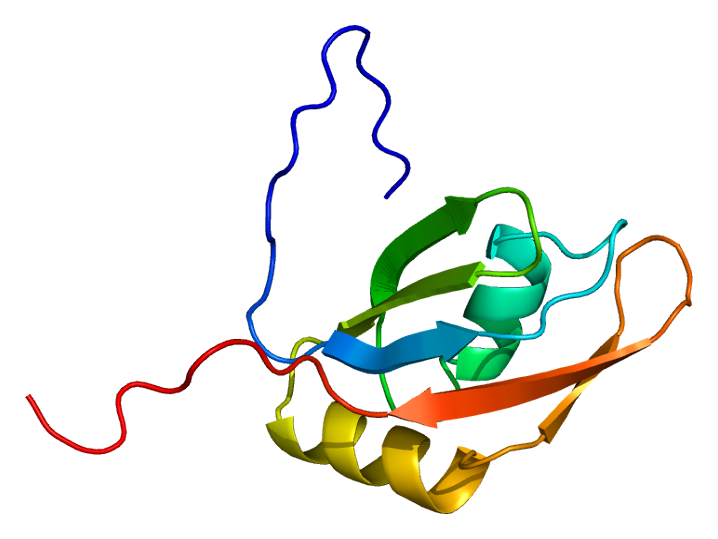

Identifiers
- Aliases: SRSF9, SFRS9, SRp30c, serine/arginine-rich splicing factor 9, serine and arginine rich splicing factor 9
- External IDs: OMIM: 601943; MGI: 104896; GeneCards: SRSF9

Gene location (Human)
Chr.	Chromosome 12 (human)
Band	12q24.31	Start	120,461,672 bp
Band	12q24.31	End	120,469,748 bp

Gene location (Mouse)
Chr.	Chromosome 5 (mouse)
Band	5|5 F	Start	115,465,236 bp
Band	5|5 F	End	115,471,139 bp
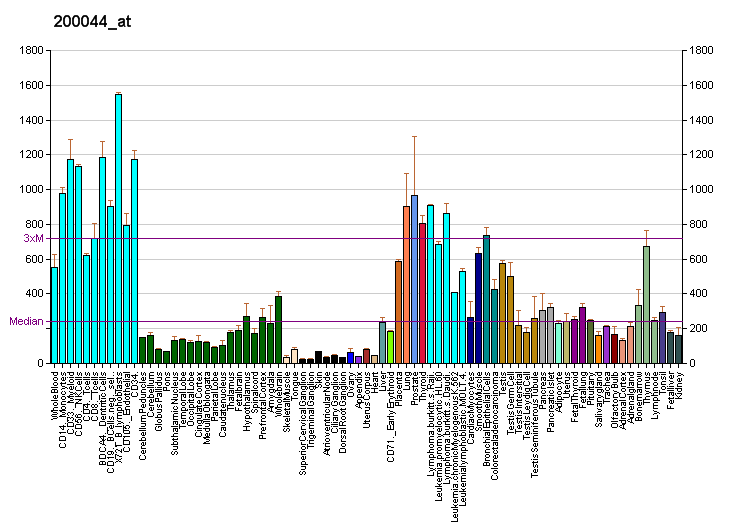

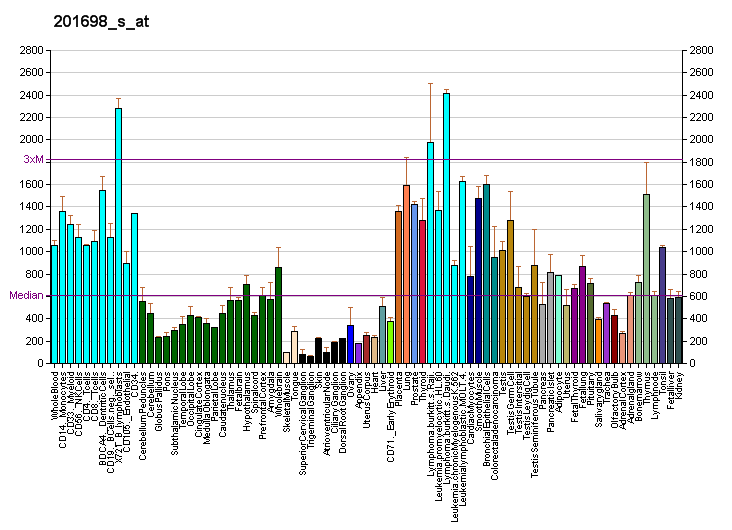
RNA expression pattern
Bgee	Human / Mouse (ortholog); Top expressed in: body of pancreas; monocyte; ventricular zone; buccal mucosa cell; right testis; ganglionic eminence; beta cell; palpebral conjunctiva; mucosa of pharynx; right adrenal cortex / Top expressed in: renal corpuscle; Gonadal ridge; epiblast; endocardial cushion; somite; molar; medullary collecting duct; hand; primitive streak; ureter; More reference expression data
BioGPS	More reference expression data
Gene ontology
Molecular function	protein binding; nucleic acid binding; RNA binding; protein domain specific binding
Cellular component	nucleolus; nucleus; nucleoplasm; nuclear speck
Biological process	mRNA splicing, via spliceosome; termination of RNA polymerase II transcription; mRNA processing; negative regulation of mRNA splicing, via spliceosome; mRNA splice site selection; mRNA export from nucleus; mRNA 3'-end processing; response to alkaloid; RNA export from nucleus; RNA splicing; response to toxic substance; regulation of alternative mRNA splicing, via spliceosome; mRNA cis splicing, via spliceosome
Sources:Amigo / QuickGO
Orthologs
Databases	NCBI: entry; OMA: entry
Species	Human	Mouse
Entrez	8683	108014
Ensembl	ENSG00000111786	ENSMUSG00000029538
UniProt	Q13242	Q9D0B0
RefSeq (mRNA)	NM_003769	NM_025573
RefSeq (protein)	NP_003760	NP_079849
Location (UCSC)	Chr 12: 120.46 – 120.47 Mb	Chr 5: 115.47 – 115.47 Mb
PubMed search
- Wikidata
View/Edit Human	View/Edit Mouse

Splicing factor, arginine/serine-rich 9, also known as SFRS9, is a human gene encoding an SR protein involved in splice site selection in alternative splicing.

== Interactions ==
SFRS9 has been shown to interact with Y box binding protein 1 and NOL3.
