= Kelch-like protein 25 =

Protein-coding gene in the species Homo sapiens

KLHL25

Identifiers
- Aliases: KLHL25, ENC-2, ENC2, kelch like family member 25
- External IDs: MGI: 2668031; GeneCards: KLHL25

Gene location (Human)
Chr.	Chromosome 15 (human)
Band	15q25.3	Start	85,759,326 bp
Band	15q25.3	End	85,794,925 bp

Gene location (Mouse)
Chr.	Chromosome 7 (mouse)
Band	7|7 D1	Start	75,498,058 bp
Band	7|7 D1	End	75,523,879 bp
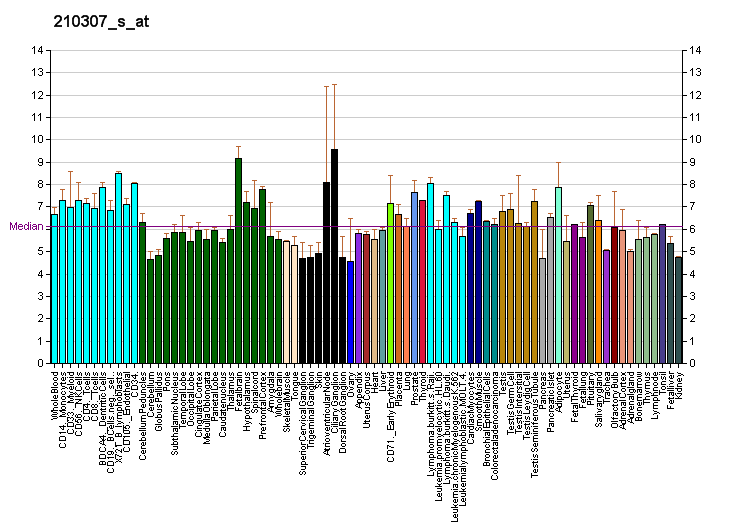
RNA expression pattern
Bgee	Human / Mouse (ortholog); Top expressed in: ventricular zone; ganglionic eminence; Brodmann area 10; right lobe of liver; oocyte; gonad; skin of leg; gastrocnemius muscle; right testis; secondary oocyte / Top expressed in: granulocyte; molar; internal carotid artery; spermatocyte; external carotid artery; spermatid; epithelium of lens; calvaria; ventricular zone; conjunctival fornix; More reference expression data
BioGPS	More reference expression data
Orthologs
Databases	NCBI: entry; OMA: entry
Species	Human	Mouse
Entrez	64410	207952
Ensembl	ENSG00000183655	ENSMUSG00000055652
UniProt	Q9H0H3	Q8R2P1
RefSeq (mRNA)	NM_022480	NM_001122780; NM_029652; NM_182782
RefSeq (protein)	NP_071925	NP_001116252; NP_083928; NP_877583
Location (UCSC)	Chr 15: 85.76 – 85.79 Mb	Chr 7: 75.5 – 75.52 Mb
PubMed search
- Wikidata
View/Edit Human	View/Edit Mouse

Ectoderm-neural cortex protein 2 is a protein that in humans is encoded by the KLHL25 gene.
