= SFSWAP =

Protein-coding gene in the species Homo sapiens

Available structures
PDB	Ortholog search: PDBe RCSB
PDB	List of PDB id codes 2E5Z, 2E60

Identifiers
- Aliases: SFSWAP, SFRS8, SWAP, splicing factor SWAP homolog, splicing factor SWAP
- External IDs: OMIM: 601945; MGI: 101760; HomoloGene: 134548; GeneCards: SFSWAP; OMA:SFSWAP - orthologs

Gene location (Human)
Chr.	Chromosome 12 (human)
Band	12q24.33	Start	131,711,081 bp
Band	12q24.33	End	131,799,738 bp

Gene location (Mouse)
Chr.	Chromosome 5 (mouse)
Band	5|5 G1.3	Start	129,578,285 bp
Band	5|5 G1.3	End	129,648,448 bp
RNA expression pattern
Bgee	Human / Mouse (ortholog); Top expressed in: sural nerve; tendon of biceps brachii; olfactory bulb; internal globus pallidus; external globus pallidus; beta cell; right hemisphere of cerebellum; pars reticulata; cardia; left ovary / Top expressed in: tail of embryo; genital tubercle; neural layer of retina; ventricular zone; zygote; cerebellar cortex; superior frontal gyrus; primary visual cortex; granulocyte; thymus; More reference expression data
BioGPS	n/a
Gene ontology
Molecular function	protein binding; RNA binding
Cellular component	nucleus
Biological process	mRNA processing; RNA processing; negative regulation of mRNA splicing, via spliceosome; regulation of transcription, DNA-templated; alternative mRNA splicing, via spliceosome; transcription, DNA-templated; RNA splicing; mRNA 5'-splice site recognition
Sources:Amigo / QuickGO
Orthologs
Species	Human	Mouse
Entrez	6433	231769
Ensembl	ENSG00000061936	ENSMUSG00000029439
UniProt	Q12872	Q3USH5
RefSeq (mRNA)	NM_001261411; NM_004592; NM_152235	NM_001035259; NM_172276; NM_001359952; NM_001378915; NM_001378916 NM_001378917
RefSeq (protein)	NP_001248340; NP_004583	NP_758480; NP_001346881; NP_001365844; NP_001365845; NP_001365846
Location (UCSC)	Chr 12: 131.71 – 131.8 Mb	Chr 5: 129.58 – 129.65 Mb
PubMed search
- Wikidata
View/Edit Human	View/Edit Mouse

Splicing factor, suppressor of white-apricot homolog is a protein in humans that is encoded by the SFSWAP gene.

This gene encodes a human homolog of Drosophila splicing regulatory protein. This gene autoregulates its expression by control of splicing of its first two introns. In addition, it also regulates the splicing of fibronectin and CD45 genes. Two transcript variants encoding different isoforms have been identified.
