= PPIG (gene) =

Protein-coding gene in the species Homo sapiens

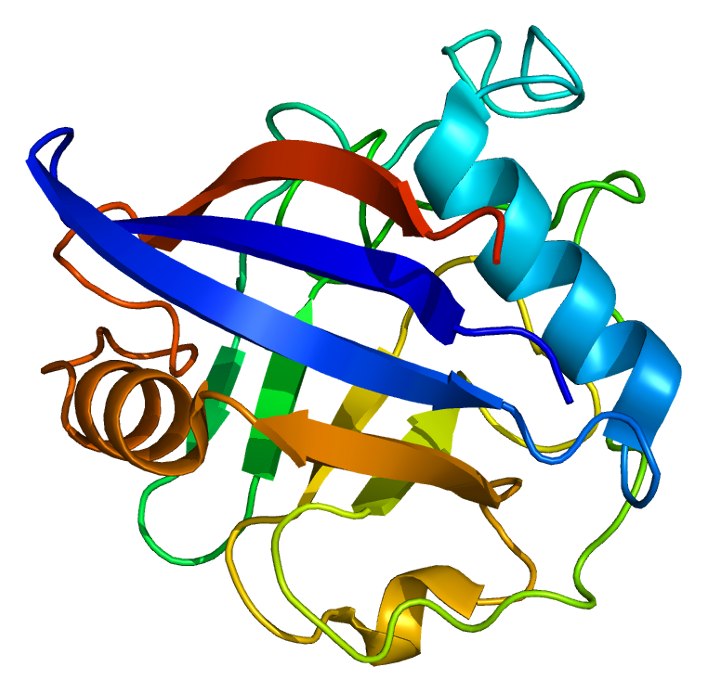

Identifiers
- Aliases: PPIG, CARS-Cyp, CYP, SCAF10, SRCyp, peptidylprolyl isomerase G
- External IDs: OMIM: 606093; MGI: 2445173; GeneCards: PPIG
Available structures
PDB	Ortholog search: PDBe RCSB
PDB	List of PDB id codes 2GW2, 2WFI, 2WFJ
Enzyme activity
EC #	BRENDA	ExPASy	KEGG	MetaCyc
5.2.1.8	↗	↗	↗	↗

Gene location (Human)
Chr.	Chromosome 2 (human)
Band	2q31.1	Start	169,584,342 bp
Band	2q31.1	End	169,641,406 bp

Gene location (Mouse)
Chr.	Chromosome 2 (mouse)
Band	2|2 C2	Start	69,552,889 bp
Band	2|2 C2	End	69,584,356 bp
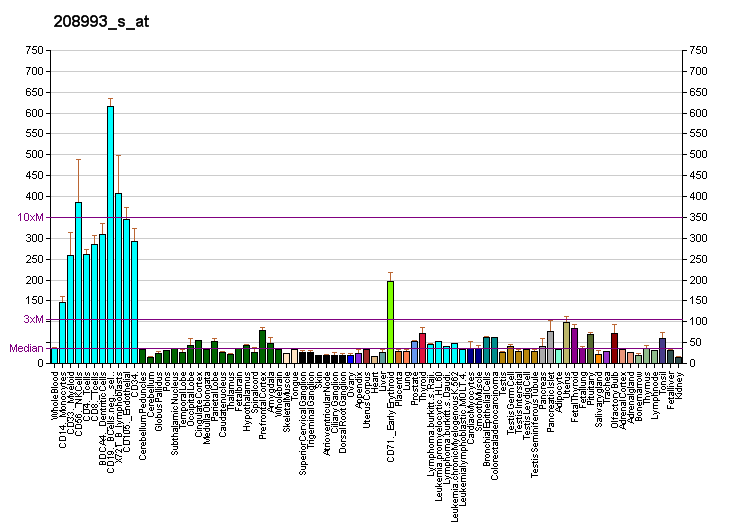

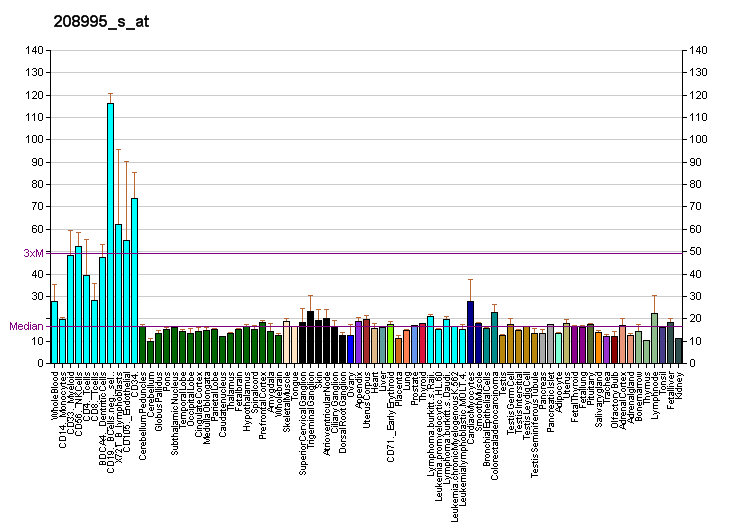

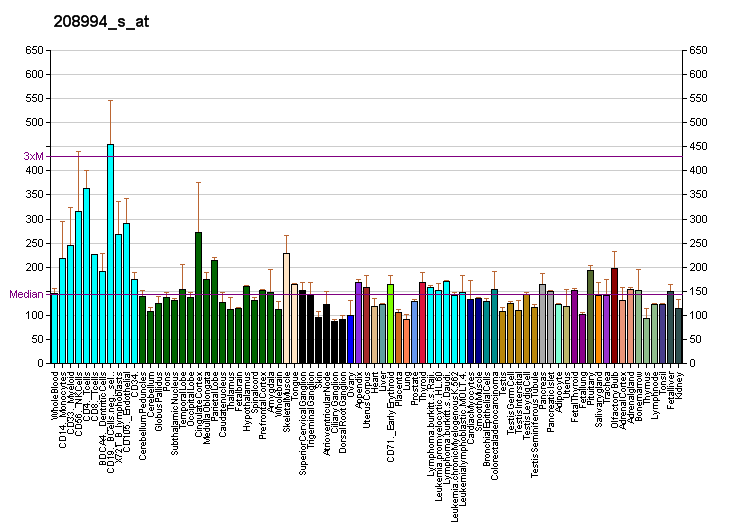
RNA expression pattern
Bgee	Human / Mouse (ortholog); Top expressed in: sural nerve; secondary oocyte; Achilles tendon; internal globus pallidus; tendon of biceps brachii; superficial temporal artery; caput epididymis; pylorus; lactiferous duct; tail of epididymis / Top expressed in: zygote; genital tubercle; morula; tail of embryo; saccule; otic placode; otic vesicle; secondary oocyte; blastocyst; embryo; More reference expression data
BioGPS	More reference expression data
Gene ontology
Molecular function	cyclosporin A binding; protein binding; isomerase activity; RNA binding; peptidyl-prolyl cis-trans isomerase activity; unfolded protein binding
Cellular component	nuclear matrix; nucleus; nucleoplasm; cytosol; nuclear speck
Biological process	protein folding; RNA splicing; protein peptidyl-prolyl isomerization; protein refolding
Sources:Amigo / QuickGO
Orthologs
Databases	NCBI: entry; OMA: entry
Species	Human	Mouse
Entrez	9360	228005
Ensembl	ENSG00000138398	ENSMUSG00000042133
UniProt	Q13427	A2AR02
RefSeq (mRNA)	NM_004792	NM_001081086
RefSeq (protein)	NP_004783	NP_001074555; NP_001394390; NP_001394391; NP_001394392; NP_001394393 NP_001394394; NP_001394395; NP_001394397; NP_001394402; NP_001394403; NP_001394404; NP_001394405; NP_001394406; NP_001394407; NP_001394408; NP_001394409; NP_001394410; NP_001394411; NP_001394412; NP_001394413
Location (UCSC)	Chr 2: 169.58 – 169.64 Mb	Chr 2: 69.55 – 69.58 Mb
PubMed search
- Wikidata
View/Edit Human	View/Edit Mouse

Peptidyl-prolyl cis-trans isomerase G is an enzyme that in humans is encoded by the PPIG gene.

== Interactions ==
PPIG (gene) has been shown to interact with Pinin.
