= SRSF10 =

Protein found found in humans

Identifiers
- Aliases: SRSF10, FUSIP1, FUSIP2, NSSR, PPP1R149, SFRS13, SFRS13A, SRp38, SRrp40, TASR, TASR1, TASR2, serine/arginine-rich splicing factor 10, serine and arginine rich splicing factor 10
- External IDs: OMIM: 605221; MGI: 1333805; GeneCards: SRSF10

Gene location (Human)
Chr.	Chromosome 1 (human)
Band	1p36.11	Start	23,964,347 bp
Band	1p36.11	End	23,980,927 bp

Gene location (Mouse)
Chr.	Chromosome 4 (mouse)
Band	4|4 D3	Start	135,583,058 bp
Band	4|4 D3	End	135,597,219 bp
RNA expression pattern
Bgee	Human / Mouse (ortholog); Top expressed in: ventricular zone; Achilles tendon; ganglionic eminence; sural nerve; tibia; gastric mucosa; right uterine tube; left ovary; rectum; left lobe of thyroid gland / Top expressed in: tail of embryo; genital tubercle; ventricular zone; embryo; embryo; yolk sac; neural layer of retina; spermatocyte; epiblast; ganglionic eminence; More reference expression data
BioGPS	n/a
Gene ontology
Molecular function	unfolded protein binding; RS domain binding; protein binding; nucleic acid binding; RNA binding
Cellular component	cytoplasm; nucleus; nucleoplasm; cytosol; nuclear speck
Biological process	RNA splicing, via transesterification reactions; mRNA splicing, via spliceosome; mRNA processing; spliceosomal tri-snRNP complex assembly; regulation of transcription, DNA-templated; negative regulation of mRNA splicing, via spliceosome; mRNA splice site selection; mRNA export from nucleus; RNA splicing; regulation of mRNA splicing, via spliceosome; cytosolic transport; regulation of RNA splicing; regulation of alternative mRNA splicing, via spliceosome; mRNA 5'-splice site recognition; mRNA cis splicing, via spliceosome
Sources:Amigo / QuickGO
Orthologs
Databases	NCBI: entry; OMA: entry
Species	Human	Mouse
Entrez	10772	14105
Ensembl	ENSG00000188529	ENSMUSG00000028676
UniProt	O75494; Q5JRI1	Q9R0U0
RefSeq (mRNA)	NM_001191005; NM_001191006; NM_001191007; NM_001191009; NM_001300936 NM_001300937; NM_006625; NM_054016	NM_001080387; NM_001284195; NM_001284196; NM_010178
RefSeq (protein)	NP_001177934; NP_001177935; NP_001177936; NP_001177938; NP_001287865 NP_001287866; NP_006616; NP_473357; NP_001287865.1	NP_001073856; NP_001271124; NP_001271125; NP_034308
Location (UCSC)	Chr 1: 23.96 – 23.98 Mb	Chr 4: 135.58 – 135.6 Mb
PubMed search
- Wikidata
View/Edit Human	View/Edit Mouse

Serine/arginine-rich splicing factor 10 is a protein that in humans is encoded by the SRSF10 gene (previously SFRS13A, FUSIP1, or FUSIP2).

== Function ==
This gene product is a member of the serine-arginine (SR) family of proteins, which is involved in constitutive and regulated RNA splicing. Members of this family are characterized by N-terminal RNP1 and RNP2 motifs, which are required for binding to RNA, and multiple C-terminal SR/RS repeats, which are important in mediating association with other cellular proteins. This protein can influence splice site selection of adenovirus E1A pre-mRNA. It interacts with the oncoprotein TLS and abrogates the influence of TLS on E1A pre-mRNA splicing. Alternative splicing of this gene results in at least two transcript variants encoding different isoforms. In addition, transcript variants utilizing alternative polyA sites exist.

== Interactions ==
FUSIP1 has been shown to interact with FUS.
