= CCAR1 =

Protein-coding gene in humans

Identifiers
- Aliases: CCAR1, cell division cycle and apoptosis regulator 1
- External IDs: OMIM: 612569; MGI: 1914750; GeneCards: CCAR1

Gene location (Human)
Chr.	Chromosome 10 (human)
Band	10q21.3	Start	68,721,012 bp
Band	10q21.3	End	68,792,377 bp

Gene location (Mouse)
Chr.	Chromosome 10 (mouse)
Band	10|10 B4	Start	62,579,707 bp
Band	10|10 B4	End	62,628,065 bp
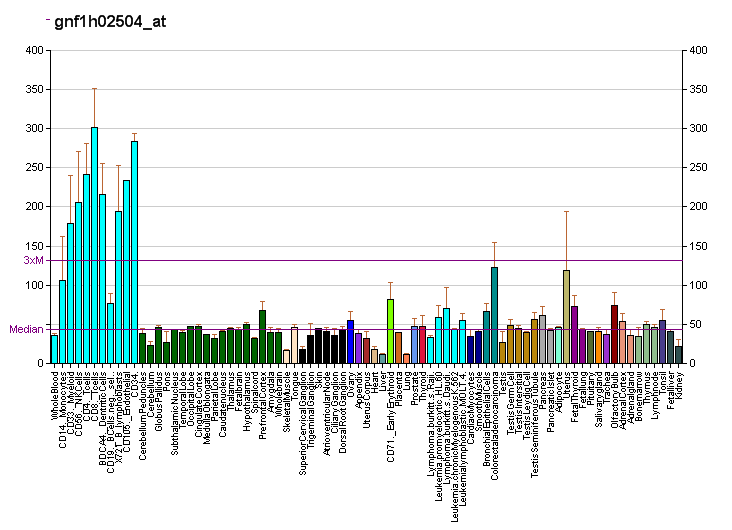

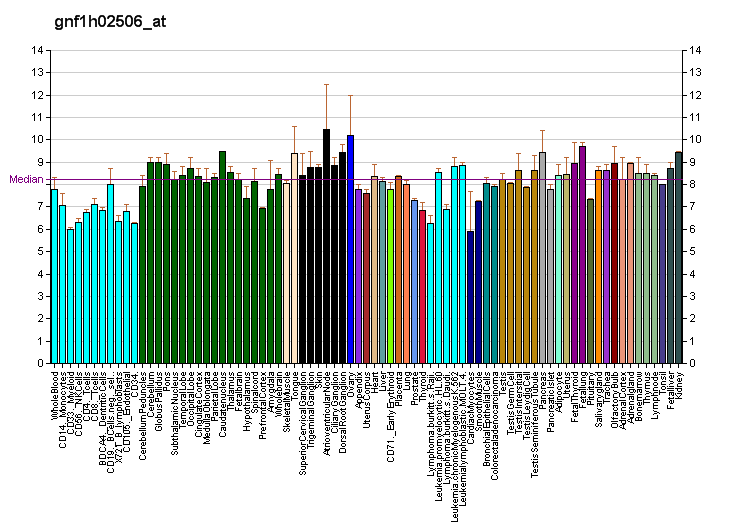

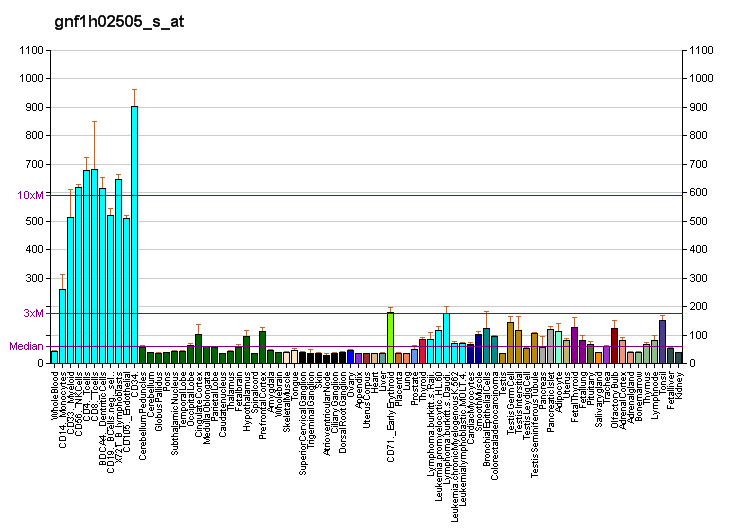
RNA expression pattern
Bgee	Human / Mouse (ortholog); Top expressed in: sperm; pancreatic ductal cell; visceral pleura; parietal pleura; ventricular zone; sural nerve; pylorus; Achilles tendon; ganglionic eminence; seminal vesicula / Top expressed in: genital tubercle; tail of embryo; Rostral migratory stream; human fetus; ciliary body; migratory enteric neural crest cell; maxillary prominence; abdominal wall; pineal gland; mandibular prominence; More reference expression data
BioGPS	More reference expression data
Gene ontology
Molecular function	protein binding; transcription corepressor activity; nuclear receptor coactivator activity; transcription coactivator activity; RNA binding; RNA polymerase II cis-regulatory region sequence-specific DNA binding
Cellular component	cytoplasm; perinuclear region of cytoplasm; nucleoplasm; nucleus
Biological process	positive regulation of cell migration; mRNA splicing, via spliceosome; cell cycle; regulation of transcription, DNA-templated; transcription, DNA-templated; positive regulation of cell population proliferation; apoptotic process; negative regulation of nucleic acid-templated transcription; positive regulation of nucleic acid-templated transcription
Sources:Amigo / QuickGO
Orthologs
Databases	NCBI: entry; OMA: entry
Species	Human	Mouse
Entrez	55749	67500
Ensembl	ENSG00000060339	ENSMUSG00000020074
UniProt	Q8IX12	Q8CH18
RefSeq (mRNA)	NM_001282959; NM_001282960; NM_018237	NM_026201
RefSeq (protein)	NP_001269888; NP_001269889; NP_060707	NP_080477
Location (UCSC)	Chr 10: 68.72 – 68.79 Mb	Chr 10: 62.58 – 62.63 Mb
PubMed search
- Wikidata
View/Edit Human	View/Edit Mouse

Cell Division Cycle and Apoptosis Regulator Protein 1 is a protein that is encoded in humans by the CCAR1 gene.
