= MIAT =

MIAT may refer to:

- Mazda MX-5 Miata, a car
- MIAT Mongolian Airlines
- MIAT (museum), a textile and industry museum in Belgium
- MIAT (gene), a long non-coding RNA gene

Miat may refer to:

- an alternative name for the plant Memecylon edule
