= SF3A1 =

Protein-coding gene in the species Homo sapiens

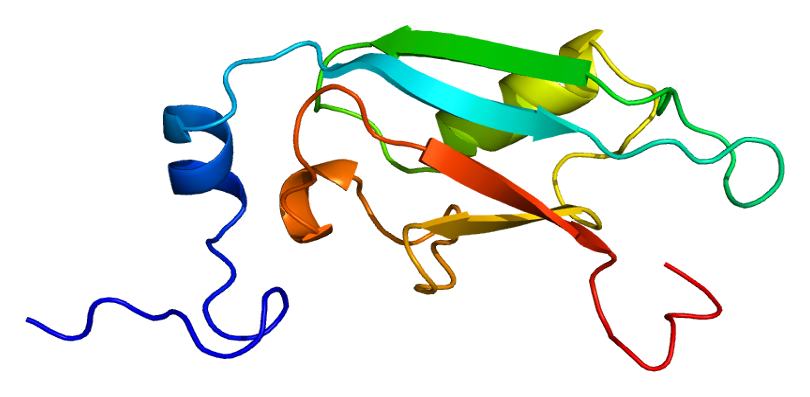

Identifiers
- Aliases: SF3A1, PRP21, PRPF21, SAP114, SF3A120, splicing factor 3a subunit 1
- External IDs: OMIM: 605595; MGI: 1914715; GeneCards: SF3A1
Available structures
PDB	Ortholog search: PDBe RCSB
PDB	List of PDB id codes 1ZKH, 2DT6, 2DT7

Gene location (Human)
Chr.	Chromosome 22 (human)
Band	22q12.2	Start	30,331,988 bp
Band	22q12.2	End	30,356,919 bp

Gene location (Mouse)
Chr.	Chromosome 11 (mouse)
Band	11|11 A1	Start	4,110,350 bp
Band	11|11 A1	End	4,132,541 bp
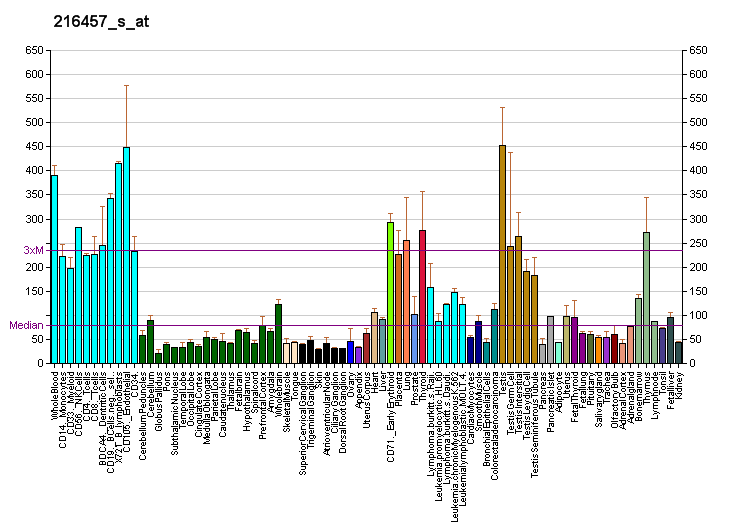

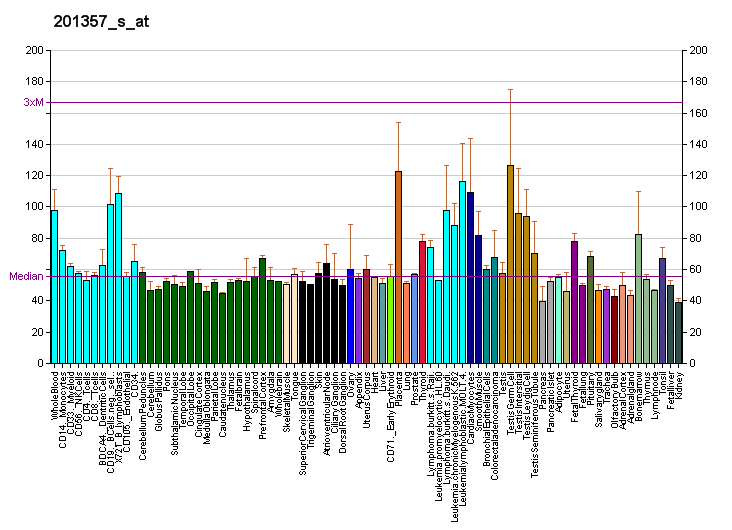

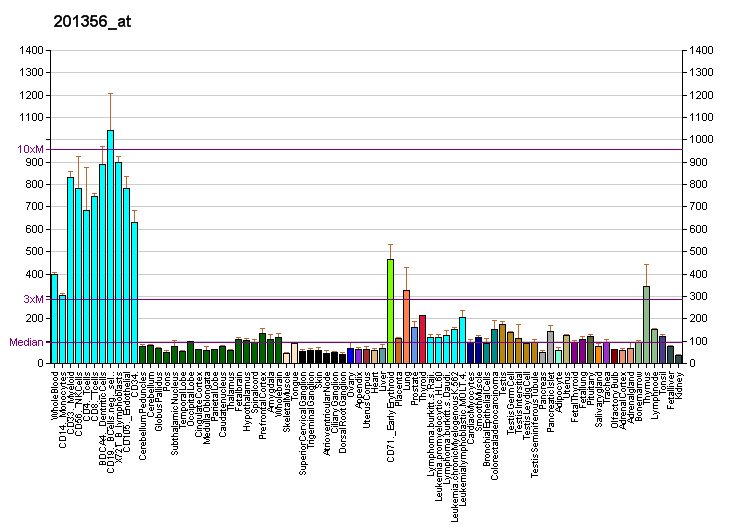
RNA expression pattern
Bgee	Human / Mouse (ortholog); Top expressed in: sperm; sural nerve; stromal cell of endometrium; ganglionic eminence; ventricular zone; epithelium of colon; bone marrow cell; left ovary; left testis; right testis / Top expressed in: epiblast; yolk sac; otic vesicle; tail of embryo; ventricular zone; genital tubercle; saccule; somite; neural layer of retina; zygote; More reference expression data
BioGPS	More reference expression data
Gene ontology
Molecular function	protein binding; RNA binding
Cellular component	catalytic step 2 spliceosome; spliceosomal complex; U2-type spliceosomal complex; U2-type prespliceosome; nucleus; nucleoplasm; nuclear speck; U2 snRNP; U2-type precatalytic spliceosome
Biological process	mRNA splicing, via spliceosome; mRNA processing; RNA processing; mRNA 3'-splice site recognition; RNA splicing; regulation of alternative mRNA splicing, via spliceosome; U2-type prespliceosome assembly
Sources:Amigo / QuickGO
Orthologs
Databases	NCBI: entry; OMA: entry
Species	Human	Mouse
Entrez	10291	67465
Ensembl	ENSG00000099995	ENSMUSG00000002129
UniProt	Q15459	Q8K4Z5
RefSeq (mRNA)	NM_005877; NM_001005409	NM_026175
RefSeq (protein)	NP_005868	NP_080451
Location (UCSC)	Chr 22: 30.33 – 30.36 Mb	Chr 11: 4.11 – 4.13 Mb
PubMed search
- Wikidata
View/Edit Human	View/Edit Mouse

Splicing factor 3 subunit 1 is a protein that in humans is encoded by the SF3A1 gene.

This gene encodes subunit 1 of the splicing factor 3a protein complex. The splicing factor 3a heterotrimer includes subunits 1, 2 and 3 and is necessary for the in vitro conversion of 15S U2 snRNP into an active 17S particle that performs pre-mRNA splicing. Subunit 1 belongs to the SURP protein family; named for the SURP (also called SWAP or Suppressor-of-White-APricot) motifs that are thought to mediate RNA binding. Subunit 1 has tandemly repeated SURP motifs in its amino-terminal half while its carboxy-terminal half contains a proline-rich region and a ubiquitin-like domain. Binding studies with truncated subunit 1 derivatives demonstrated that the two SURP motifs are necessary for binding to subunit 3 while contacts with subunit 2 may occur through sequences carboxy-terminal to the SURP motifs. Alternative splicing results in multiple transcript variants encoding different isoforms.

== Interactions ==
SF3A1 has been shown to interact with SF3A3 and CDC5L.
