= H3B-8800 =

Identifiers
- IUPAC name: [(2S,3S,4E,6S,7R,10R)-7,10-dihydroxy-3,7-dimethyl-12-oxo-2-[(2E,4E,6R)-6-pyridin-2-ylhepta-2,4-dien-2-yl]-1-oxacyclododec-4-en-6-yl] 4-methylpiperazine-1-carboxylate
- CAS Number: 1825302-42-8
- PubChem CID: 92135969
- DrugBank: DB14017
- ChemSpider: 71360838
- UNII: 90YLS47BRX

Chemical and physical data
- Formula: C_{31}H_{45}N_{3}O_{6}
- Molar mass: 555.716 g·mol^{−1}
- 3D model (JSmol): Interactive image
- SMILES: C[C@H]1/C=C/[C@@H]([C@](CC[C@H](CC(=O)O[C@@H]1/C(=C/C=C/[C@@H](C)C2=CC=CC=N2)/C)O)(C)O)OC(=O)N3CCN(CC3)C
- InChI: InChI=1S/C31H45N3O6/c1-22(26-11-6-7-16-32-26)9-8-10-23(2)29-24(3)12-13-27(39-30(37)34-19-17-33(5)18-20-34)31(4,38)15-14-25(35)21-28(36)40-29/h6-13,16,22,24-25,27,29,35,38H,14-15,17-21H2,1-5H3/b9-8+,13-12+,23-10+/t22-,24+,25-,27+,29-,31-/m1/s1; Key:YOIQWBAHJZGRFW-WVRLKXNASA-N

H3B-8800 is an experimental drug which acts as an inhibitor of the SF3B1 protein, which forms part of the splicing factor 3b protein complex. This is commonly mutated in some forms of cancer, principally leukemia but also some subtypes of breast cancer and melanoma. H3B-8800 has reached early stage human clinical trials in patients whose cancers express mutations that make them susceptible to inhibition of SF3B1.
