= SLU7 =

Protein-coding gene in the species Homo sapiens

Identifiers
- Aliases: SLU7, 9G8, hSlu7, SLU7 homolog, splicing factor
- External IDs: OMIM: 605974; MGI: 2385598; GeneCards: SLU7

Gene location (Human)
Chr.	Chromosome 5 (human)
Band	5q33.3	Start	160,401,641 bp
Band	5q33.3	End	160,421,711 bp

Gene location (Mouse)
Chr.	Chromosome 11 (mouse)
Band	11|11 B1.1	Start	43,324,571 bp
Band	11|11 B1.1	End	43,338,808 bp
RNA expression pattern
Bgee	Human / Mouse (ortholog); Top expressed in: testicle; Achilles tendon; colon; superior frontal gyrus; sural nerve; prefrontal cortex; islet of Langerhans / Top expressed in: saccule; otic vesicle; otic placode; genital tubercle; granulocyte; zygote; deep cerebellar nuclei; facial motor nucleus; vestibular sensory epithelium; ventricular zone; More reference expression data
BioGPS	n/a
Gene ontology
Molecular function	pre-mRNA 3'-splice site binding; second spliceosomal transesterification activity; metal ion binding; protein binding; nucleic acid binding; zinc ion binding
Cellular component	cytoplasm; nuclear speck; catalytic step 2 spliceosome; membrane; intracellular membrane-bounded organelle; small nuclear ribonucleoprotein complex; spliceosomal complex; nucleus; nucleoplasm; cytosol
Biological process	cellular response to heat; RNA splicing, via transesterification reactions; mRNA processing; mRNA 3'-splice site recognition; RNA splicing; intracellular protein transport; alternative mRNA splicing, via spliceosome; RNA export from nucleus; mRNA splicing, via spliceosome; mRNA export from nucleus; mRNA 3'-end processing; termination of RNA polymerase II transcription
Sources:Amigo / QuickGO
Orthologs
Databases	NCBI: entry; OMA: entry
Species	Human	Mouse
Entrez	10569	193116
Ensembl	ENSG00000164609	ENSMUSG00000020409
UniProt	O95391	Q8BHJ9
RefSeq (mRNA)	NM_006425	NM_148673; NM_198936
RefSeq (protein)	NP_006416; NP_001351446; NP_001351447; NP_001351449; NP_001351450 NP_001351451; NP_001351452	NP_683514; NP_945174
Location (UCSC)	Chr 5: 160.4 – 160.42 Mb	Chr 11: 43.32 – 43.34 Mb
PubMed search
- Wikidata
View/Edit Human	View/Edit Mouse

Pre-mRNA-splicing factor SLU7 is a protein that in humans is encoded by the SLU7 gene.

Pre-mRNA splicing occurs in two sequential transesterification steps. The protein encoded by this gene is a splicing factor that has been found to be essential during the second catalytic step in the pre-mRNA splicing process. It associates with the spliceosome and contains a zinc knuckle motif that is found in other splicing factors and is involved in protein-nucleic acid and protein-protein interactions.
