= Herboxidiene =

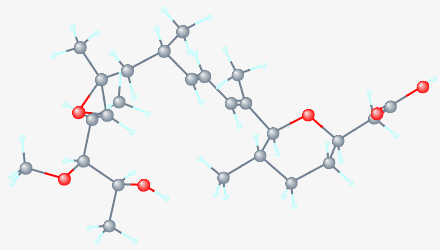

Names
- Preferred IUPAC name {(2R,5S,6S)-6-[(2E,4E,6S)-7-{(2R,3R)-3-[(2R,3R,4R)-4-Hydroxy-3-methoxypentan-2-yl]-2-methyloxiran-2-yl}-6-methylhepta-2,4-dien-2-yl]-5-methyloxan-2-yl}acetic acid
- Other names GEX1A

Identifiers
CAS Number	142861-00-5
3D model (JSmol)	Interactive image
ChemSpider	4942968
PubChem CID	6438496
UNII	QSB7EM5EUD
- InChI: InChI=1S/C25H42O6/c1-15(14-25(6)24(31-25)18(4)23(29-7)19(5)26)9-8-10-16(2)22-17(3)11-12-20(30-22)13-21(27)28/h8-10,15,17-20,22-24,26H,11-14H2,1-7H3,(H,27,28)/b9-8+,16-10+/t15-,17+,18-,19-,20-,22-,23-,24-,25-/m1/s1 Key: ISZXEMUWHQLLTC-LSIVYLFASA-N
- SMILES: C[C@H]1CC[C@@H](O[C@@H]1/C(=C/C=C/[C@@H](C)C[C@@]2([C@H](O2)[C@H](C)[C@H]([C@@H](C)O)OC)C)/C)CC(=O)O

Properties
Chemical formula	C_{25}H_{42}O_{6}
Molar mass	438.605 g·mol^{−1}
- Except where otherwise noted, data are given for materials in their standard state (at 25 °C [77 °F], 100 kPa). Infobox references

Herboxidiene is a polyketide molecule soluble in polar solvents such as water, ethanol, n-butanol and acetone but insoluble in non-polar solvents such as hexane. It was first isolated from the fermentation broth of Streptomyces chromofuscus by Monsanto in 1992. Herboxidiene shows in vitro antitumor activity by targeting the SF3B protein in the splicesosome. Many antitumor derivatives have also been developed from herboxidiene through chemical modification.

== Structure ==
Compared to other polyketide compounds, herboxidiene has a unique epoxide functional group. This structure results a relative low yield in the chemical synthesis of herboxidiene as the epoxidation usually accompany with other oxidized products such as ketones, carboxylic acids and aldehydes.

Multiple chiral centers are another bottleneck in the chemical synthesis of herboxidiene. There are nine chiral centers in the herboxidiene molecule and stereoselective methods are necessities of herboxidiene synthesis.

== Biosynthesis ==
Biosynthesis of herboxidiene has been studied for over 20 years since its discovery. The precursor of herboxidiene, 18-deoxy-25-demethyl herboxitriene was first synthesized in Streptomyces chromofuscus through a nine-modules PKS I pathway. 18-Deoxy-25-demethyl herboxitriene is then epoxidized by enzyme HerE on the carbon carbon double bond between C14 and C15, oxidized by enzyme HerG on C-18 and eventually methylated by enzyme HerF on C25 to herboxidiene with the help of cofactor S-adenosyl methionine (SAM).

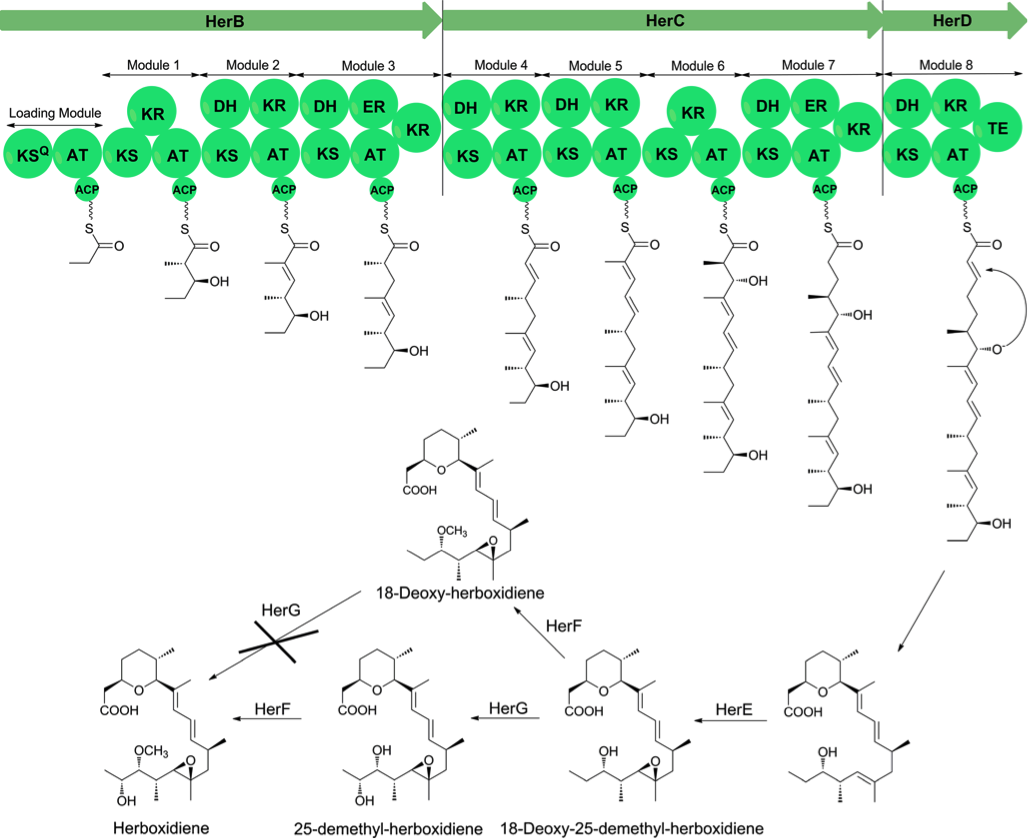
Biosynthesis of herboxidiene in PKS I pathway

== Anti-tumor mechanism ==
Herboxdiene suppresses the growth of tumor cells by interfering the splicing of pre-mRNA coding for cell cycle regulation proteins in our body. The target of herboxidiene was discovered in 2011. In their research they discovered herboxidiene can bind with SF3B1 (formerly known as SAP155), one of the seven spliceosome-associated proteins that form the SF3b complex. By binding to SF3B1, herboxidiene can trigger the accumulation of both protein p27 and its C-terminus truncated version p27*. p27 and p27* are important proteins that regulate cell cycle of mammalian cells. Accumulation of p27 and p27* results in inhibition of cells entering G1 and S phases of the cell cycle and therefore can contain the growth of tumour cells.
