= B3/B4 tRNA-binding domain =

B3_4
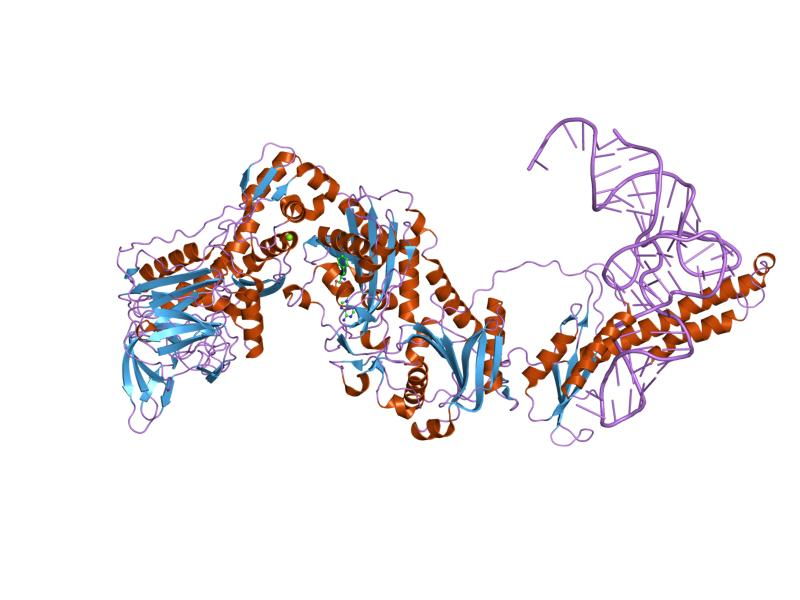
- phenylalanyl-tRNA synthetase from Thermus thermophilus complexed with tRNA and a phenylalanyl-adenylate analog

Identifiers
- Symbol: B3_4
- Pfam: PF03483
- Pfam clan: CL0383
- InterPro: IPR005146
- SCOP2: 1pys / SCOPe / SUPFAM
Available protein structures:
- Pfam: structures / ECOD
- PDB: RCSB PDB; PDBe; PDBj
- PDBsum: structure summary

The B3/B4 domain, is found in tRNA synthetase beta subunits, as well as in some non-tRNA synthetase proteins.

== Function ==
Aminoacyl-tRNA synthetases can catalyse editing reactions to correct errors produced during amino acid activation and tRNA esterification, in order to prevent the attachment of incorrect amino acids to tRNA. The B3/B4 domain of the beta subunit contains an editing site, which lies close to the active site on the alpha subunit. Disruption of this site abolished tRNA editing, a process that is essential for faithful translation of the genetic code.

== Structure ==
This domain has a 3-layer structure, and contains a beta-sandwich fold of unusual topology, and contains a putative tRNA-binding structural motif. In Thermus thermophilus, both the catalytic alpha- and the non-catalytic beta-subunits comprise the characteristic fold of the class II active-site domains. The presence of an RNA-binding domain, similar to that of the U1A spliceosomal protein, in the beta-subunit of tRNA synthetase indicates structural relationships among different families of RNA-binding proteins.
