= SF3B6 =

Protein-coding gene in the species Homo sapiens

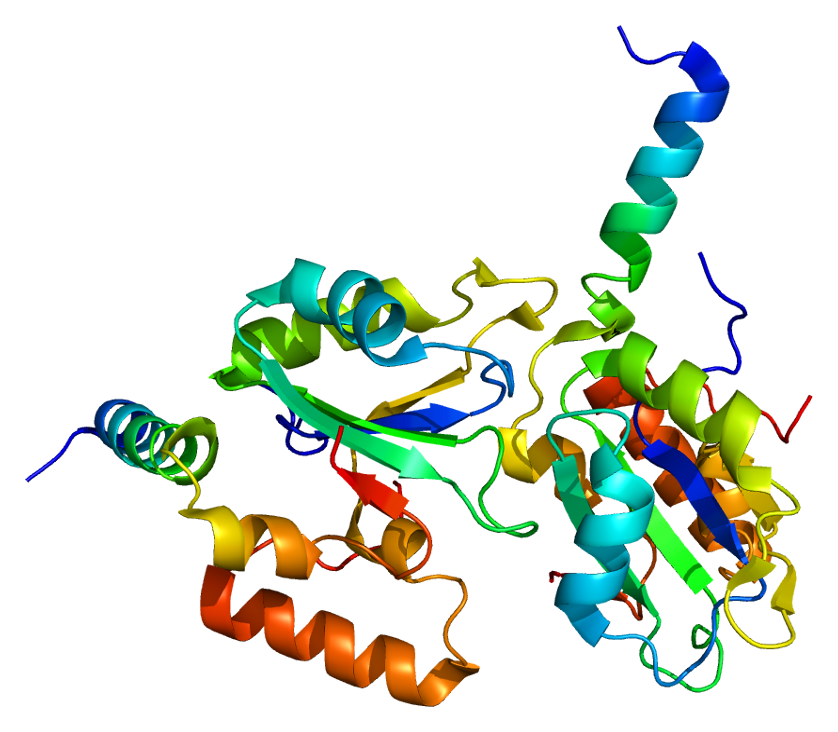

Identifiers
- Aliases: SF3B6, HSPC175, Ht006, P14, SAP14, SAP14a, SF3B14, SF3B14a, CGI-110, splicing factor 3b subunit 6
- External IDs: OMIM: 607835; MGI: 1913305; GeneCards: SF3B6
Available structures
PDB	Ortholog search: PDBe RCSB
PDB	List of PDB id codes 2F9D, 2F9J, 2FHO, 3LQV

Gene location (Human)
Chr.	Chromosome 2 (human)
Band	2p23.3	Start	24,067,586 bp
Band	2p23.3	End	24,076,373 bp

Gene location (Mouse)
Chr.	Chromosome 12 (mouse)
Band	12|12 A1.1	Start	4,867,544 bp
Band	12|12 A1.1	End	4,877,659 bp
RNA expression pattern
Bgee	Human / Mouse (ortholog); Top expressed in: skin of arm; mucosa of ileum; olfactory zone of nasal mucosa; Achilles tendon; mucosa of sigmoid colon; ganglionic eminence; cartilage tissue; islet of Langerhans; rectum; tibialis anterior muscle / Top expressed in: saccule; otic placode; otic vesicle; medial ganglionic eminence; transitional epithelium of urinary bladder; migratory enteric neural crest cell; abdominal wall; cervix; endocardial cushion; ventricular zone; More reference expression data
BioGPS	n/a
Gene ontology
Molecular function	nucleic acid binding; RNA binding; protein binding; mRNA binding
Cellular component	catalytic step 2 spliceosome; U12-type spliceosomal complex; U2-type spliceosomal complex; precatalytic spliceosome; nucleus; U2 snRNP; nucleoplasm; spliceosomal complex
Biological process	mRNA splicing, via spliceosome; mRNA processing; blastocyst formation; RNA splicing
Sources:Amigo / QuickGO
Orthologs
Databases	NCBI: entry; OMA: entry
Species	Human	Mouse
Entrez	51639	66055
Ensembl	ENSG00000115128	ENSMUSG00000037361
UniProt	Q9Y3B4	P59708
RefSeq (mRNA)	NM_016047	NM_025323
RefSeq (protein)	NP_057131	NP_079599
Location (UCSC)	Chr 2: 24.07 – 24.08 Mb	Chr 12: 4.87 – 4.88 Mb
PubMed search
- Wikidata
View/Edit Human	View/Edit Mouse

Splicing factor 3B subunit 6, is a protein encoded by SF3B6 gene in vertebrates.

== Function ==
This gene encodes a 14 kDa protein subunit of the splicing factor 3b complex. Splicing factor 3b associates with both the U2 and U11/U12 small nuclear ribonucleoprotein complexes (U2 snRNP) of spliceosomes. This 14 kDa protein interacts directly with subunit 1 of the splicing factor 3b complex. This 14 kDa protein also interacts directly with the adenosine that carries out the first transesterification step of splicing at the pre-mRNA branch site.

== Interactions ==
SF3B14 has been shown to interact with SF3B1.
