= SRRM1 =

Protein-coding gene in humans

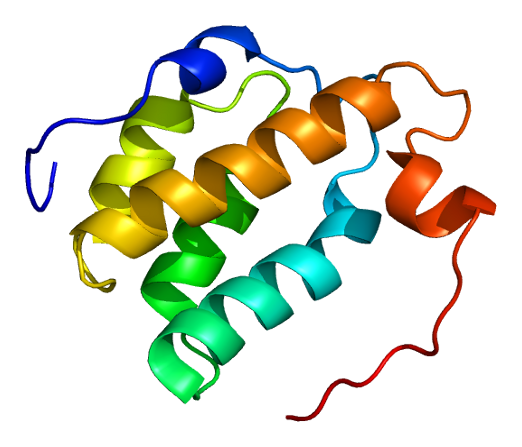

Identifiers
- Aliases: SRRM1, 160-KD, POP101, SRM160, serine and arginine repetitive matrix 1
- External IDs: OMIM: 605975; MGI: 1858303; GeneCards: SRRM1
Available structures
PDB	Ortholog search: PDBe RCSB
PDB	List of PDB id codes 1MP1

Gene location (Human)
Chr.	Chromosome 1 (human)
Band	1p36.11	Start	24,631,716 bp
Band	1p36.11	End	24,673,267 bp

Gene location (Mouse)
Chr.	Chromosome 4 (mouse)
Band	4|4 D3	Start	135,320,484 bp
Band	4|4 D3	End	135,353,321 bp
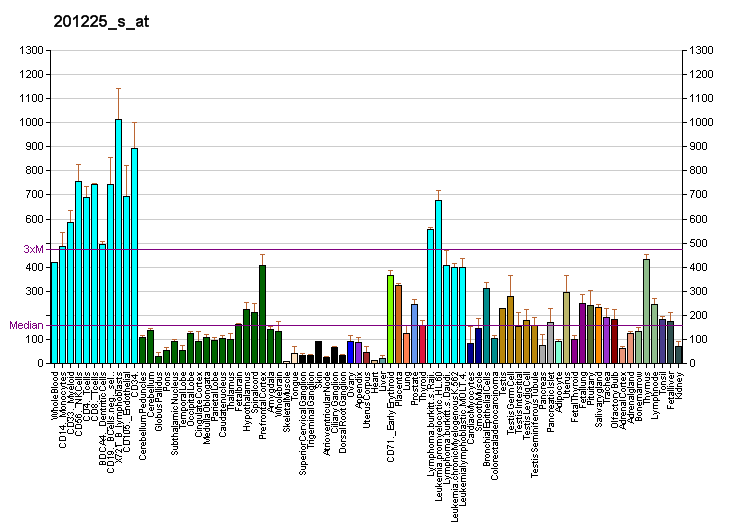

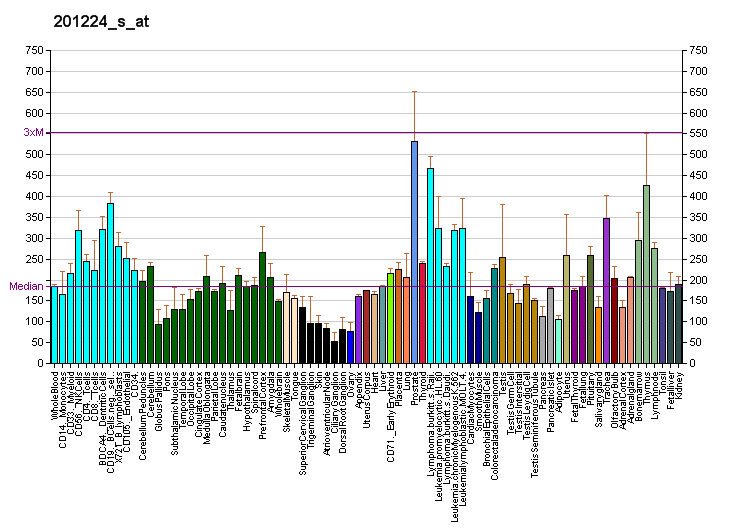
RNA expression pattern
Bgee	Human / Mouse (ortholog); Top expressed in: corpus epididymis; sural nerve; caput epididymis; right uterine tube; left ovary; buccal mucosa cell; right ovary; body of uterus; tail of epididymis; right hemisphere of cerebellum / Top expressed in: tail of embryo; genital tubercle; primitive streak; Paneth cell; abdominal wall; neural layer of retina; ciliary body; Ileal epithelium; zygote; cumulus cell; More reference expression data
BioGPS	More reference expression data
Gene ontology
Molecular function	DNA binding; protein binding; RNA binding
Cellular component	nuclear matrix; cytosol; catalytic step 2 spliceosome; spliceosomal complex; nucleus; nucleoplasm; nuclear speck
Biological process	RNA splicing, via transesterification reactions; mRNA splicing, via spliceosome; termination of RNA polymerase II transcription; mRNA processing; mRNA 3'-end processing; mRNA export from nucleus; RNA splicing; RNA export from nucleus
Sources:Amigo / QuickGO
Orthologs
Databases	NCBI: entry; OMA: entry
Species	Human	Mouse
Entrez	10250	51796
Ensembl	ENSG00000133226	ENSMUSG00000028809
UniProt	Q8IYB3	Q52KI8
RefSeq (mRNA)	NM_001303448; NM_001303449; NM_005839	NM_001130477; NM_016799; NM_001369067; NM_001369068; NM_001369069 NM_001369070; NM_001369071; NM_001369072; NM_001369073; NM_001369074
RefSeq (protein)	NP_001290377; NP_001290378; NP_005830; NP_001353494; NP_001353495 NP_001353496; NP_001353497; NP_001353498; NP_001353499; NP_001353500; NP_001353501; NP_001353502; NP_001353504; NP_001353505; NP_001353506; NP_001353507; NP_001353510; NP_001353511; NP_001353513; NP_001353514; NP_001353515; NP_001353516; NP_001353517; NP_001353518; NP_001353519; NP_001353520; NP_001353521; NP_001353522; NP_001353523; NP_001353524; NP_001353525; NP_001353526; NP_001353527; NP_001353528; NP_001353529	NP_001123949; NP_058079; NP_001355996; NP_001355997; NP_001355998 NP_001355999; NP_001356000; NP_001356001; NP_001356002; NP_001356003
Location (UCSC)	Chr 1: 24.63 – 24.67 Mb	Chr 4: 135.32 – 135.35 Mb
PubMed search
- Wikidata
View/Edit Human	View/Edit Mouse

Serine/arginine repetitive matrix protein 1 is a protein that in humans is encoded by the SRRM1 gene.

SRRM1 is a component of a splicing-associated regulatory network implicated in chemotherapy resistance in acute myeloid leukemia (AML). In chemoresistant AML cells, hyperphosphorylation of SRRM1 by the kinase families PAK1 and CLK1/4 was reported to alter its scaffolding function and drive alternative splicing programs, including expression of the full-length MAP2K5 isoform, that contribute to chemotherapy resistance.

== Interactions ==
SRRM1 has been shown to interact with CDC5L.
