= GCN1 =

Protein-coding gene in humans

Identifiers
- Aliases: GCN1, GCN1L, PRIC295, GCN1L1, eIF2 alpha kinase activator homolog, GCN1 activator of EIF2AK4
- External IDs: OMIM: 605614; MGI: 2444248; GeneCards: GCN1

Gene location (Human)
Chr.	Chromosome 12 (human)
Band	12q24.23	Start	120,127,202 bp
Band	12q24.23	End	120,194,715 bp

Gene location (Mouse)
Chr.	Chromosome 5 (mouse)
Band	5|5 F	Start	115,703,313 bp
Band	5|5 F	End	115,760,713 bp
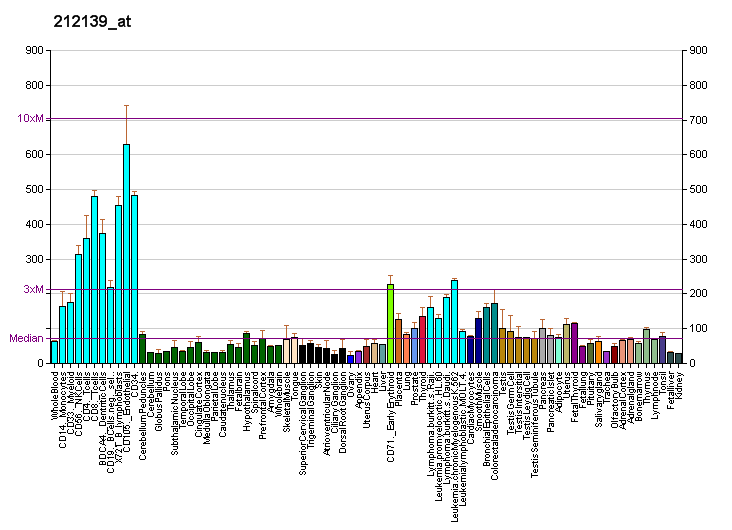

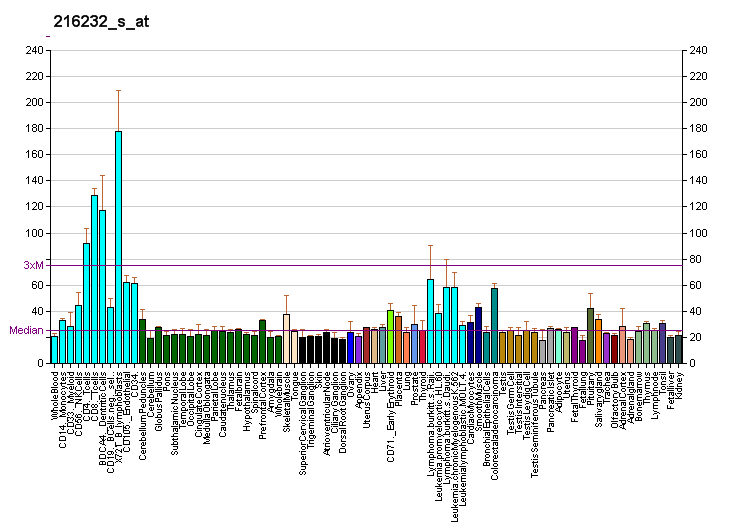
RNA expression pattern
Bgee	Human / Mouse (ortholog); Top expressed in: ventricular zone; tendon of biceps brachii; sural nerve; pylorus; gastrocnemius muscle; cardia; stromal cell of endometrium; right lobe of thyroid gland; nipple; granulocyte / Top expressed in: neural layer of retina; Rostral migratory stream; ventricular zone; lumbar subsegment of spinal cord; spermatid; muscle of thigh; yolk sac; superior frontal gyrus; secondary oocyte; primary visual cortex; More reference expression data
BioGPS	More reference expression data
Gene ontology
Molecular function	ribosome binding; translation factor activity, RNA binding; protein kinase binding; protein kinase regulator activity; RNA binding; cadherin binding
Cellular component	polysome; ribosome; membrane; cytoplasm; cytosol
Biological process	positive regulation of transcription from RNA polymerase II promoter in response to stress; positive regulation of kinase activity; cellular response to stress; cellular response to amino acid starvation; regulation of protein kinase activity; cellular response to leucine starvation; regulation of translation; protein biosynthesis
Sources:Amigo / QuickGO
Orthologs
Databases	NCBI: entry; OMA: entry
Species	Human	Mouse
Entrez	10985	231659
Ensembl	ENSG00000089154	ENSMUSG00000041638
UniProt	Q92616	E9PVA8
RefSeq (mRNA)	NM_006836	NM_172719
RefSeq (protein)	NP_006827	NP_766307
Location (UCSC)	Chr 12: 120.13 – 120.19 Mb	Chr 5: 115.7 – 115.76 Mb
PubMed search
- Wikidata
View/Edit Human	View/Edit Mouse

Translational activator GCN1 is a protein that in humans is encoded by the GCN1 gene (previously GCN1L1).

== Interactions ==
GCN1 has been shown to interact with CDC5L.
