= PLRG1 =

Protein-coding gene in the species Homo sapiens

Identifiers
- Aliases: PLRG1, Cwc1, PRL1, PRP46, PRPF46, TANGO4, pleiotropic regulator 1
- External IDs: OMIM: 605961; MGI: 1858197; GeneCards: PLRG1
Available structures
PDB	Ortholog search: PDBe RCSB
PDB	List of PDB id codes 4YVD

Gene location (Human)
Chr.	Chromosome 4 (human)
Band	4q31.3	Start	154,535,005 bp
Band	4q31.3	End	154,550,400 bp

Gene location (Mouse)
Chr.	Chromosome 3 (mouse)
Band	3|3 E3	Start	82,962,829 bp
Band	3|3 E3	End	82,979,662 bp
RNA expression pattern
Bgee	Human / Mouse (ortholog); Top expressed in: secondary oocyte; Achilles tendon; islet of Langerhans; smooth muscle tissue; body of uterus; left lobe of thyroid gland; palpebral conjunctiva; right lobe of thyroid gland; rectum; right uterine tube / Top expressed in: primitive streak; primary oocyte; maxillary prominence; mandibular prominence; medial ganglionic eminence; endocardial cushion; somite; abdominal wall; epiblast; superior cervical ganglion; More reference expression data
BioGPS	n/a
Gene ontology
Molecular function	protein binding
Cellular component	DNA replication factor A complex; Cul4-RING E3 ubiquitin ligase complex; catalytic step 2 spliceosome; nuclear membrane; spliceosomal complex; precatalytic spliceosome; Prp19 complex; fibrillar center; nucleoplasm; nuclear speck; U2-type catalytic step 2 spliceosome; nucleus
Biological process	protein localization to nucleus; positive regulation of G1/S transition of mitotic cell cycle; mRNA processing; RNA splicing; mRNA splicing, via spliceosome
Sources:Amigo / QuickGO
Orthologs
Databases	NCBI: entry; OMA: entry
Species	Human	Mouse
Entrez	5356	53317
Ensembl	ENSG00000171566	ENSMUSG00000027998
UniProt	O43660	Q922V4
RefSeq (mRNA)	NM_002669; NM_001201564	NM_016784
RefSeq (protein)	NP_001188493; NP_002660	NP_058064
Location (UCSC)	Chr 4: 154.54 – 154.55 Mb	Chr 3: 82.96 – 82.98 Mb
PubMed search
- Wikidata
View/Edit Human	View/Edit Mouse

Pleiotropic regulator 1 is a protein that in humans is encoded by the PLRG1 gene.

== Interactions ==
PLRG1 has been shown to interact with CDC5L.
