= CWC15 =

Protein-coding gene in the species Homo sapiens

Identifiers
- Aliases: CWC15, AD002, C11orf5, Cwf15, HSPC148, ORF5, CWC15 spliceosome-associated protein, CWC15 spliceosome associated protein homolog
- External IDs: MGI: 1913320; GeneCards: CWC15

Gene location (Human)
Chr.	Chromosome 11 (human)
Band	11q21	Start	94,962,620 bp
Band	11q21	End	94,973,586 bp

Gene location (Mouse)
Chr.	Chromosome 9 (mouse)
Band	9|9 A2	Start	14,411,913 bp
Band	9|9 A2	End	14,421,873 bp
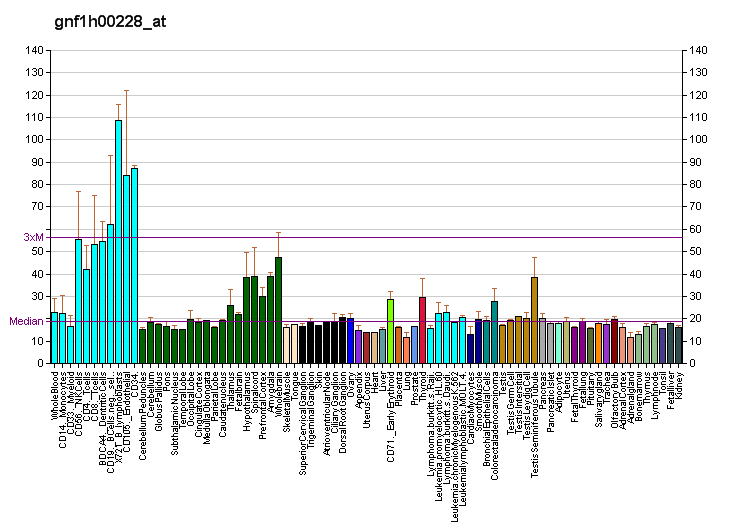
RNA expression pattern
Bgee	Human / Mouse (ortholog); Top expressed in: tibialis anterior muscle; cardiac muscle tissue of right atrium; myocardium of left ventricle; Skeletal muscle tissue of rectus abdominis; vastus lateralis muscle; biceps brachii; Skeletal muscle tissue of biceps brachii; body of tongue; muscle of thigh; left testis / Top expressed in: ventricular zone; neural layer of retina; muscle of thigh; morula; yolk sac; embryo; epiblast; embryo; tail of embryo; lip; More reference expression data
BioGPS	More reference expression data
Gene ontology
Molecular function	protein binding; RNA binding
Cellular component	catalytic step 2 spliceosome; spliceosomal complex; nucleus; nucleoplasm; mitochondrion; nuclear speck; U2-type catalytic step 2 spliceosome
Biological process	mRNA processing; RNA splicing; mRNA splicing, via spliceosome; mRNA cis splicing, via spliceosome
Sources:Amigo / QuickGO
Orthologs
Databases	NCBI: entry; OMA: entry
Species	Human	Mouse
Entrez	51503	66070
Ensembl	ENSG00000150316	ENSMUSG00000004096
UniProt	Q9P013	Q9JHS9
RefSeq (mRNA)	NM_016403; NM_001363371; NM_001363372	NM_023153
RefSeq (protein)	NP_057487; NP_001350300; NP_001350301	NP_075642
Location (UCSC)	Chr 11: 94.96 – 94.97 Mb	Chr 9: 14.41 – 14.42 Mb
PubMed search
- Wikidata
View/Edit Human	View/Edit Mouse

Protein CWC15 homolog is a protein that in humans is encoded by the CWC15 gene.

== Interactions ==
CWC15 has been shown to interact with CDC5L.
