= SFRS3 =

Protein-coding gene in the species Homo sapiens

SRSF3
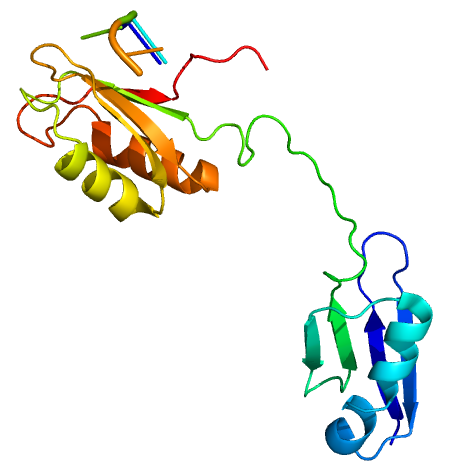

Identifiers
- Aliases: SRSF3, SFRS3, SRp20, serine/arginine-rich splicing factor 3, serine and arginine rich splicing factor 3
- External IDs: OMIM: 603364; MGI: 98285; GeneCards: SRSF3
Available structures
PDB	Ortholog search: PDBe RCSB
PDB	List of PDB id codes 2I38

Gene location (Human)
Chr.	Chromosome 6 (human)
Band	6p21.31-p21.2	Start	36,594,353 bp
Band	6p21.31-p21.2	End	36,605,600 bp

Gene location (Mouse)
Chr.	Chromosome 17 (mouse)
Band	17 A3.3|17 15.03 cM	Start	29,251,602 bp
Band	17 A3.3|17 15.03 cM	End	29,262,347 bp
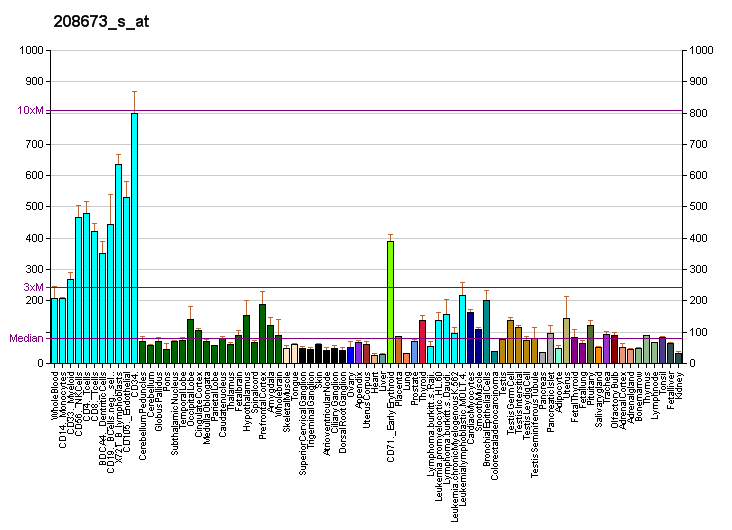

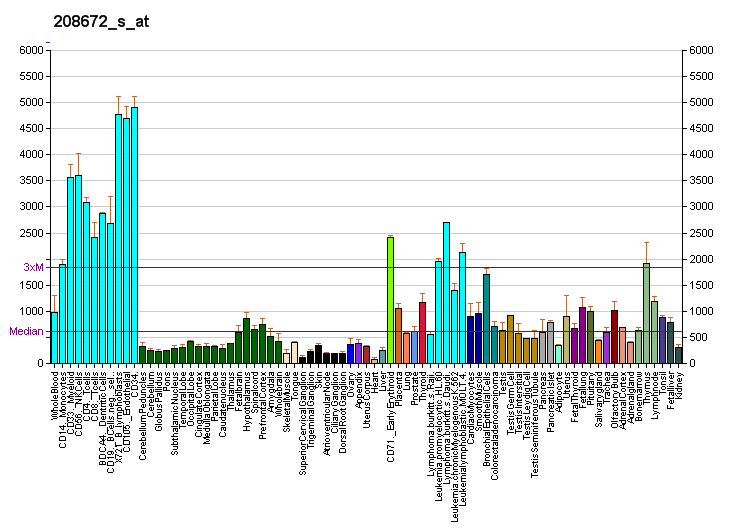

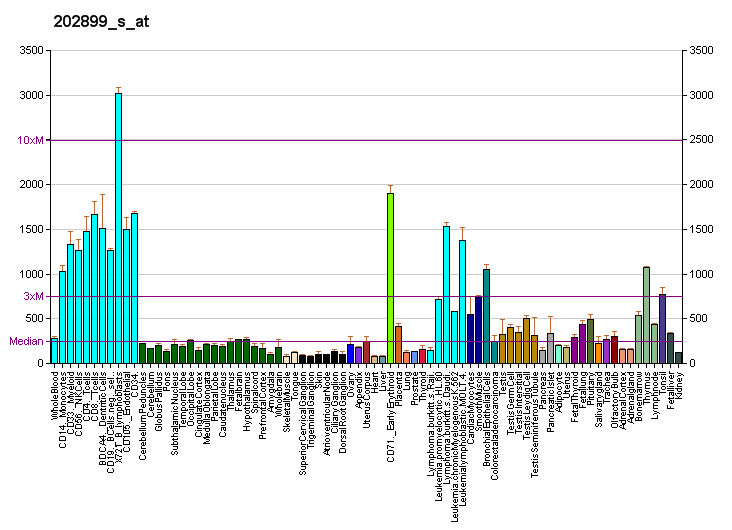
RNA expression pattern
Bgee	Human / Mouse (ortholog); Top expressed in: ventricular zone; ganglionic eminence; monocyte; pericardium; thymus; mucosa of sigmoid colon; vena cava; lymph node; epithelium of nasopharynx; amniotic fluid / Top expressed in: genital tubercle; ventricular zone; tail of embryo; medial ganglionic eminence; primitive streak; abdominal wall; embryo; embryo; neural tube; mandibular prominence; More reference expression data
BioGPS	More reference expression data
Gene ontology
Molecular function	nucleic acid binding; sequence-specific mRNA binding; protein binding; RNA binding
Cellular component	nucleus; cytoplasm; nucleoplasm; nuclear speck
Biological process	termination of RNA polymerase II transcription; mRNA 3'-end processing; mRNA splicing, via spliceosome; mRNA export from nucleus; mRNA transport; mRNA processing; RNA splicing; regulation of mRNA splicing, via spliceosome; RNA export from nucleus; transport; regulation of alternative mRNA splicing, via spliceosome; mRNA cis splicing, via spliceosome
Sources:Amigo / QuickGO
Orthologs
Databases	NCBI: entry; OMA: entry
Species	Human	Mouse
Entrez	6428	20383
Ensembl	ENSG00000112081	ENSMUSG00000071172
UniProt	P84103	P84104
RefSeq (mRNA)	NM_003017	NM_013663
RefSeq (protein)	NP_003008	NP_038691
Location (UCSC)	Chr 6: 36.59 – 36.61 Mb	Chr 17: 29.25 – 29.26 Mb
PubMed search
- Wikidata
View/Edit Human	View/Edit Mouse

Splicing factor, arginine/serine-rich 3 is a protein that in humans is encoded by the SFRS3 gene.

== Browser View ==
UCSC Genome Browser View

UCSC Gene details page

== Interactions ==
SFRS3 has been shown to interact with RBM7.
