= CDC5L =

Protein-coding gene in humans

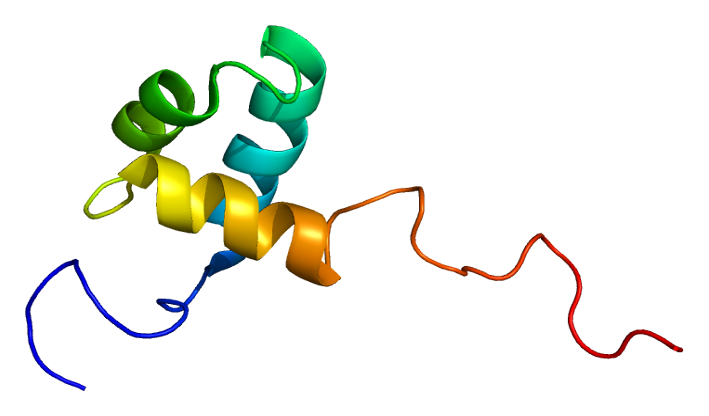

Identifiers
- Aliases: CDC5L, CDC5, CDC5-LIKE, CEF1, PCDC5RP, dJ319D22.1, cell division cycle 5 like
- External IDs: OMIM: 602868; MGI: 1918952; GeneCards: CDC5L
Available structures
PDB	Ortholog search: PDBe RCSB
PDB	List of PDB id codes 2DIM, 2DIN

Gene location (Human)
Chr.	Chromosome 6 (human)
Band	6p21.1	Start	44,387,706 bp
Band	6p21.1	End	44,450,425 bp

Gene location (Mouse)
Chr.	Chromosome 17 (mouse)
Band	17|17 B3	Start	45,702,810 bp
Band	17|17 B3	End	45,744,663 bp
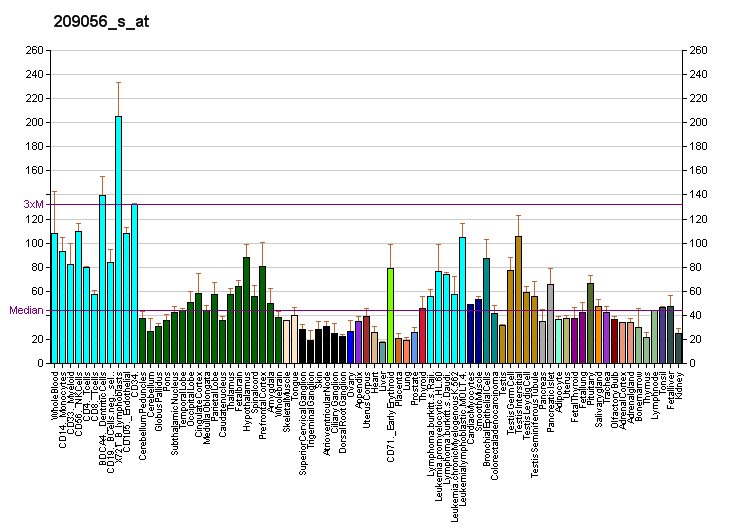

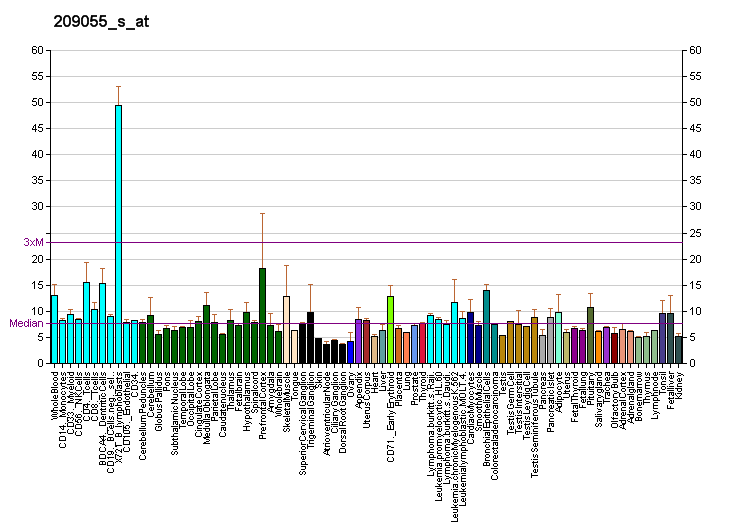

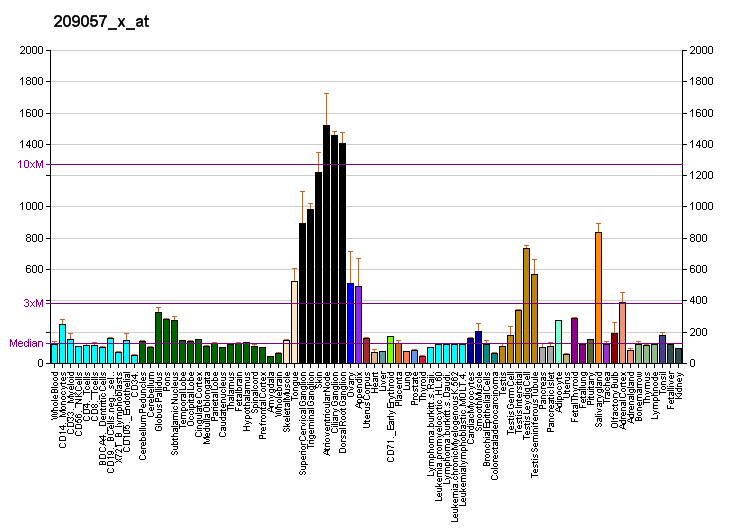
RNA expression pattern
Bgee	Human / Mouse (ortholog); Top expressed in: buccal mucosa cell; sperm; tibia; tendon of biceps brachii; internal globus pallidus; secondary oocyte; amniotic fluid; glutes; biceps brachii; Brodmann area 23 / Top expressed in: genital tubercle; tail of embryo; maxillary prominence; mandibular prominence; primitive streak; morula; renal corpuscle; morula; vestibular membrane of cochlear duct; blastocyst; More reference expression data
BioGPS	More reference expression data
Gene ontology
Molecular function	DNA binding; protein phosphatase 1 binding; leucine zipper domain binding; WD40-repeat domain binding; protein binding; transcription corepressor binding; protein kinase binding; sequence-specific DNA binding; DNA-binding transcription factor activity, RNA polymerase II-specific; RNA binding; RNA polymerase II transcription regulatory region sequence-specific DNA binding; DNA-binding transcription activator activity, RNA polymerase II-specific
Cellular component	cytoplasm; nuclear speck; catalytic step 2 spliceosome; membrane; Prp19 complex; nucleoplasm; protein-DNA complex; perinuclear region of cytoplasm; DNA replication factor A complex; spliceosomal complex; nucleus; U2-type catalytic step 2 spliceosome
Biological process	mRNA splicing, via spliceosome; cellular response to nerve growth factor stimulus; regulation of transcription, DNA-templated; mRNA processing; cellular response to fibroblast growth factor stimulus; transcription, DNA-templated; cellular response to interleukin-2; cellular response to prolactin; cellular response to DNA damage stimulus; cellular response to wortmannin; mitotic cell cycle; cell cycle; DNA repair; cell differentiation; RNA splicing; regulation of transcription by RNA polymerase II; transcription by RNA polymerase II; positive regulation of transcription by RNA polymerase II
Sources:Amigo / QuickGO
Orthologs
Databases	NCBI: entry; OMA: entry
Species	Human	Mouse
Entrez	988	71702
Ensembl	ENSG00000096401	ENSMUSG00000023932
UniProt	Q99459	Q6A068
RefSeq (mRNA)	NM_001253	NM_152810
RefSeq (protein)	NP_001244	NP_690023
Location (UCSC)	Chr 6: 44.39 – 44.45 Mb	Chr 17: 45.7 – 45.74 Mb
PubMed search
- Wikidata
View/Edit Human	View/Edit Mouse

Cell division cycle 5-like protein is a protein that in humans is encoded by the CDC5L gene.

== Function ==
The protein encoded by this gene shares a significant similarity with Schizosaccharomyces pombe cdc5 gene product, which is a cell cycle regulator important for G_{2}/M transition. This protein has been demonstrated to act as a positive regulator of cell cycle G_{2}/M progression. It was also found to be an essential component of a non-snRNA spliceosome, which contains at least five additional protein factors and is required for the second catalytic step of pre-mRNA splicing.

== Interactions ==
CDC5L has been shown to interact with:

- ASF/SF2,
- BZW1,
- CWC15,
- DNA-PKcs,
- DYNC1H1,
- GCN1L1,
- HSPA8,
- ILF2,
- PLRG1,
- PPM1D,
- PPP1CA,
- PRPF19,
- RBMX and
- RPL12,
- RPL13,
- RPS16,
- RPS25,
- SF3A1,
- SF3B1,
- SF3B2,
- SF3B4,
- SFPQ,
- SRSF2,
- SNRPA1,
- SNRPD3,
- SRRM1,
- Small nuclear ribonucleoprotein D1,
- Small nuclear ribonucleoprotein D2,
- Small nuclear ribonucleoprotein polypeptide A,
- TOP2A, and
- TTF2.

== See also ==
- G2/M checkpoint
