= SF3B5 =

Protein-coding gene in the species Homo sapiens

Identifiers
- Aliases: SF3B5, SF3b10, Ysf3, splicing factor 3b subunit 5
- External IDs: OMIM: 617847; MGI: 1913375; GeneCards: SF3B5

Gene location (Human)
| Chr. | Chromosome 6 (human) |
| Band | 6q24.2 | Start | 144,094,884 bp |
| Band | 6q24.2 | End | 144,095,573 bp |

Gene location (Mouse)
| Chr. | Chromosome 10 (mouse) |
| Band | 10|10 A2 | Start | 12,881,087 bp |
| Band | 10|10 A2 | End | 12,884,927 bp |
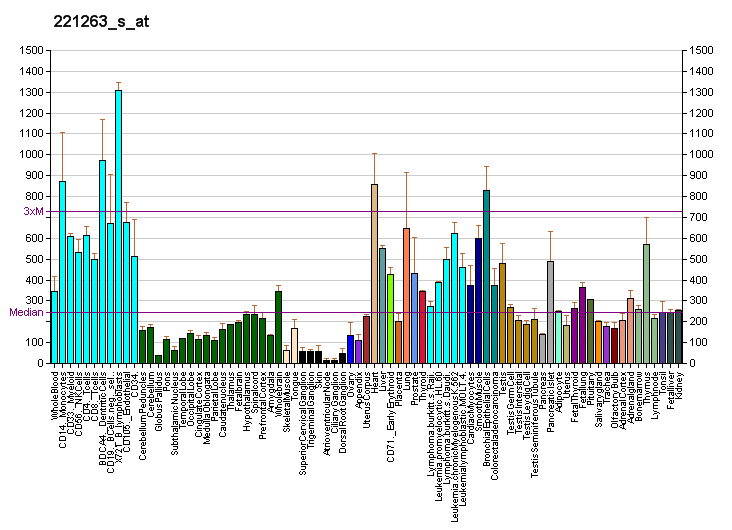
RNA expression pattern
| Bgee | Human / Mouse (ortholog); Top expressed in: anterior pituitary; mucosa of transverse colon; granulocyte; right adrenal gland; left adrenal cortex; right adrenal cortex; olfactory zone of nasal mucosa; body of pancreas; skin of leg; skin of abdomen / Top expressed in: internal carotid artery; endocardial cushion; efferent ductule; abdominal wall; mandibular prominence; external carotid artery; maxillary prominence; renal corpuscle; endothelial cell of lymphatic vessel; migratory enteric neural crest cell; More reference expression data |
| BioGPS | More reference expression data |
Gene ontology
| Molecular function | RNA binding |
| Cellular component | U12-type spliceosomal complex; spliceosomal complex; precatalytic spliceosome; nucleus; U2 snRNP; nucleoplasm; U2-type precatalytic spliceosome |
| Biological process | mRNA processing; RNA splicing; mRNA splicing, via spliceosome |
Sources:Amigo / QuickGO
Orthologs
| Databases | NCBI: entry; OMA: entry |
| Species | Human | Mouse |
| Entrez | 83443 | 66125 |
| Ensembl | ENSG00000169976 | ENSMUSG00000078348 |
| UniProt | Q9BWJ5 | Q923D4 |
| RefSeq (mRNA) | NM_031287 | NM_175102 |
| RefSeq (protein) | NP_112577 | NP_780311 |
| Location (UCSC) | Chr 6: 144.09 – 144.1 Mb | Chr 10: 12.88 – 12.88 Mb |
| PubMed search |
- Wikidata
| View/Edit Human | View/Edit Mouse |

Splicing factor 3B subunit 5 is a protein that in humans is encoded by the SF3B5 gene.

The protein is a part of splicing factor 3b.
