= SF3A3 =

Protein-coding gene in humans

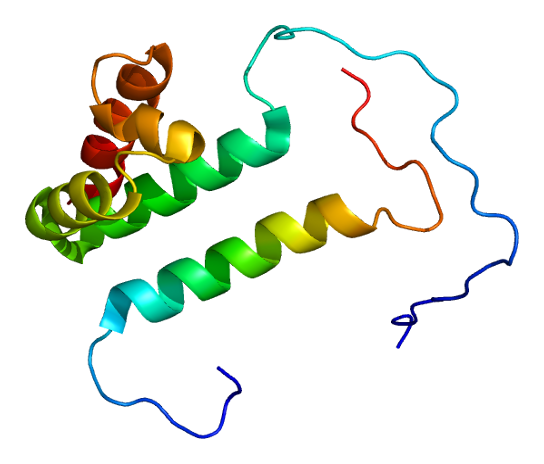

Identifiers
- Aliases: SF3A3, PRP9, PRPF9, SAP61, SF3a60, splicing factor 3a subunit 3
- External IDs: OMIM: 605596; MGI: 1922312; GeneCards: SF3A3
Available structures
PDB	Ortholog search: PDBe RCSB
PDB	List of PDB id codes 2DT7

Gene location (Human)
Chr.	Chromosome 1 (human)
Band	1p34.3	Start	37,956,975 bp
Band	1p34.3	End	37,990,075 bp

Gene location (Mouse)
Chr.	Chromosome 4 (mouse)
Band	4|4 D2.2	Start	124,608,569 bp
Band	4|4 D2.2	End	124,626,253 bp
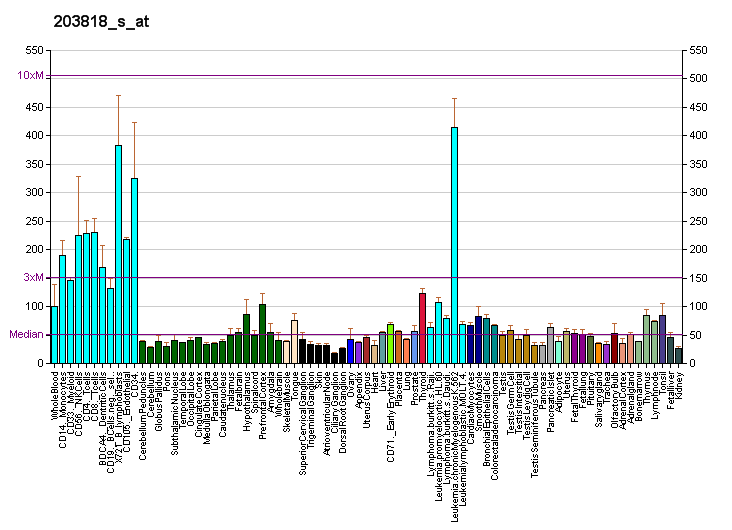
RNA expression pattern
Bgee	Human / Mouse (ortholog); Top expressed in: sural nerve; Achilles tendon; epithelium of colon; ganglionic eminence; ventricular zone; monocyte; rectum; gastrocnemius muscle; islet of Langerhans; stromal cell of endometrium / Top expressed in: otic placode; saccule; otic vesicle; primitive streak; tail of embryo; abdominal wall; epiblast; embryo; primary oocyte; mandibular prominence; More reference expression data
BioGPS	More reference expression data
Gene ontology
Molecular function	zinc ion binding; protein binding; metal ion binding; nucleic acid binding; RNA binding
Cellular component	nuclear speck; catalytic step 2 spliceosome; spliceosomal complex; nucleus; nucleoplasm; U2 snRNP; U2-type precatalytic spliceosome
Biological process	RNA splicing, via transesterification reactions; mRNA splicing, via spliceosome; mRNA processing; mRNA 3'-splice site recognition; RNA splicing; U2-type prespliceosome assembly
Sources:Amigo / QuickGO
Orthologs
Databases	NCBI: entry; OMA: entry
Species	Human	Mouse
Entrez	10946	75062
Ensembl	ENSG00000183431	ENSMUSG00000028902
UniProt	Q12874	Q9D554
RefSeq (mRNA)	NM_006802; NM_001320830	NM_029157
RefSeq (protein)	NP_001307759; NP_006793	NP_083433
Location (UCSC)	Chr 1: 37.96 – 37.99 Mb	Chr 4: 124.61 – 124.63 Mb
PubMed search
- Wikidata
View/Edit Human	View/Edit Mouse

Splicing factor 3A subunit 3 is a protein that in humans is encoded by the SF3A3 gene.

This gene encodes subunit 3 of the splicing factor 3a protein complex. The splicing factor 3a heterotrimer includes subunits 1, 2 and 3 and is necessary for the in vitro conversion of 15S U2 snRNP into an active 17S particle that performs pre-mRNA splicing. Subunit 3 interacts with subunit 1 through its amino-terminus while the zinc finger domain of subunit 3 plays a role in its binding to the 15S U2 snRNP. This gene has a pseudogene on chromosome 20.

== Interactions ==
SF3A3 has been shown to interact with SF3A1.
