= RBM7 =

Protein-coding gene in the species Homo sapiens

Identifiers
- Aliases: RBM7, RNA binding motif protein 7
- External IDs: OMIM: 612413; MGI: 1914260; GeneCards: RBM7
Available structures
PDB	Ortholog search: PDBe RCSB
PDB	List of PDB id codes 2M8H, 5IQQ

Gene location (Human)
Chr.	Chromosome 11 (human)
Band	11q23.2	Start	114,400,030 bp
Band	11q23.2	End	114,414,203 bp

Gene location (Mouse)
Chr.	Chromosome 9 (mouse)
Band	9|9 A5.3	Start	48,400,001 bp
Band	9|9 A5.3	End	48,406,599 bp
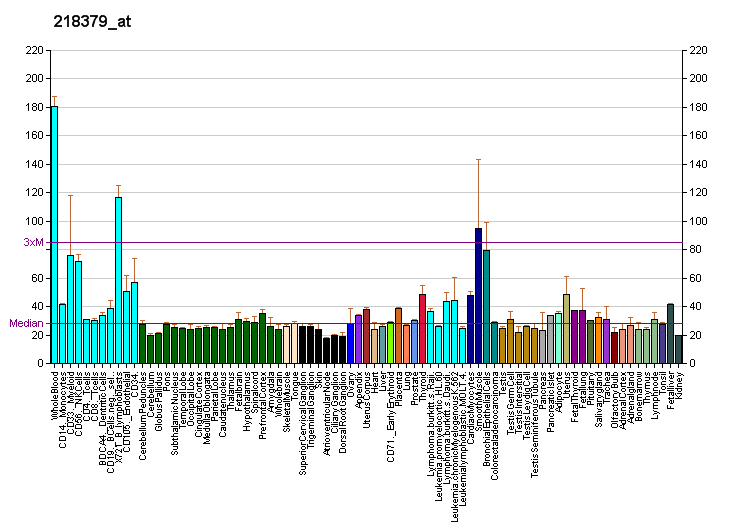
RNA expression pattern
Bgee	Human / Mouse (ortholog); Top expressed in: cartilage tissue; mucosa of sigmoid colon; Achilles tendon; germinal epithelium; epithelium of colon; stromal cell of endometrium; tail of epididymis; islet of Langerhans; skin of hip; ventricular zone / Top expressed in: seminal vesicula; medial ganglionic eminence; mesenteric lymph nodes; lacrimal gland; left lung lobe; olfactory epithelium; conjunctival fornix; sciatic nerve; hair follicle; interventricular septum; More reference expression data
BioGPS	More reference expression data
Gene ontology
Molecular function	nucleic acid binding; single-stranded RNA binding; RNA binding; protein binding
Cellular component	nucleoplasm; nucleolus; nucleus
Biological process	meiosis; regulation of alternative mRNA splicing, via spliceosome
Sources:Amigo / QuickGO
Orthologs
Databases	NCBI: entry; OMA: entry
Species	Human	Mouse
Entrez	10179	67010
Ensembl	ENSG00000076053	ENSMUSG00000042396
UniProt	Q9Y580	Q9CQT2
RefSeq (mRNA)	NM_016090; NM_001286045; NM_001286046; NM_001286047; NM_001286048	NM_144948; NM_001326355; NM_001326356
RefSeq (protein)	NP_001272974; NP_001272975; NP_001272976; NP_001272977; NP_057174	NP_001313284; NP_001313285; NP_659197
Location (UCSC)	Chr 11: 114.4 – 114.41 Mb	Chr 9: 48.4 – 48.41 Mb
PubMed search
- Wikidata
View/Edit Human	View/Edit Mouse

RNA-binding motif protein 7 is a protein that in humans is encoded by the RBM7 gene.

== Interactions ==
RBM7 has been shown to interact with SF3B2 and SFRS3.
