= PRPF19 =

Protein-coding gene in the species Homo sapiens

Identifiers
- Aliases: PRPF19, NMP200, PRP19, PSO4, SNEV, UBOX4, hPSO4, pre-mRNA processing factor 19
- External IDs: OMIM: 608330; MGI: 106247; GeneCards: PRPF19
Available structures
PDB	Ortholog search: PDBe RCSB
PDB	List of PDB id codes 4LG8
Enzyme activity
EC #	BRENDA	ExPASy	KEGG	MetaCyc
2.3.2.27	↗	↗	↗	↗

Gene location (Human)
Chr.	Chromosome 11 (human)
Band	11q12.2	Start	60,890,547 bp
Band	11q12.2	End	60,906,585 bp

Gene location (Mouse)
Chr.	Chromosome 19 (mouse)
Band	19 A|19 7.33 cM	Start	10,872,595 bp
Band	19 A|19 7.33 cM	End	10,886,923 bp
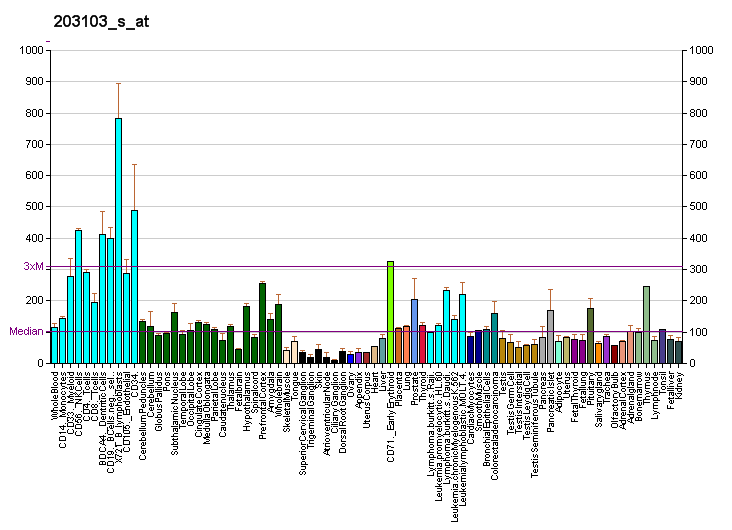
RNA expression pattern
Bgee	Human / Mouse (ortholog); Top expressed in: pons; right frontal lobe; Brodmann area 9; ventricular zone; ganglionic eminence; prefrontal cortex; cerebellar hemisphere; right hemisphere of cerebellum; anterior pituitary; islet of Langerhans / Top expressed in: aortic valve; primitive streak; motor neuron; ascending aorta; fossa; right ventricle; epiblast; Paneth cell; facial motor nucleus; ankle; More reference expression data
BioGPS	More reference expression data
Gene ontology
Molecular function	ubiquitin protein ligase activity; ubiquitin-protein transferase activity; ubiquitin-ubiquitin ligase activity; protein binding; identical protein binding; transferase activity
Cellular component	site of double-strand break; nuclear speck; catalytic step 2 spliceosome; membrane; lipid droplet; spindle; Prp19 complex; DNA replication factor A complex; spliceosomal complex; cytoskeleton; nucleus; cytoplasm; nucleoplasm; U2-type catalytic step 1 spliceosome; U2-type catalytic step 2 spliceosome
Biological process	mRNA splicing, via spliceosome; spliceosomal tri-snRNP complex assembly; lipid biosynthetic process; negative regulation of neuron differentiation; positive regulation of astrocyte differentiation; positive regulation of mRNA splicing, via spliceosome; protein K63-linked ubiquitination; mRNA processing; protein polyubiquitination; inner cell mass cell proliferation; cellular response to DNA damage stimulus; spliceosomal complex assembly; protein ubiquitination; proteasomal protein catabolic process; transcription-coupled nucleotide-excision repair; double-strand break repair via nonhomologous end joining; DNA repair; RNA splicing; generation of catalytic spliceosome for first transesterification step; positive regulation of neuron differentiation
Sources:Amigo / QuickGO
Orthologs
Databases	NCBI: entry; OMA: entry
Species	Human	Mouse
Entrez	27339	28000
Ensembl	ENSG00000110107	ENSMUSG00000024735
UniProt	Q9UMS4	Q99KP6
RefSeq (mRNA)	NM_014502	NM_001253843; NM_001253844; NM_134129
RefSeq (protein)	NP_055317	NP_001240772; NP_001240773; NP_598890
Location (UCSC)	Chr 11: 60.89 – 60.91 Mb	Chr 19: 10.87 – 10.89 Mb
PubMed search
- Wikidata
View/Edit Human	View/Edit Mouse

Pre-mRNA-processing factor 19 is a protein that in humans is encoded by the PRPF19 gene.

In S. cerevisiae, Pso4 has pleiotropic functions in DNA recombination and in error-prone nonhomologous end-joining DNA repair.[supplied by OMIM]

== Interactions ==
PRPF19 has been shown to interact with CDC5L.
