= SNRPA1 =

Protein-coding gene in the species Homo sapiens

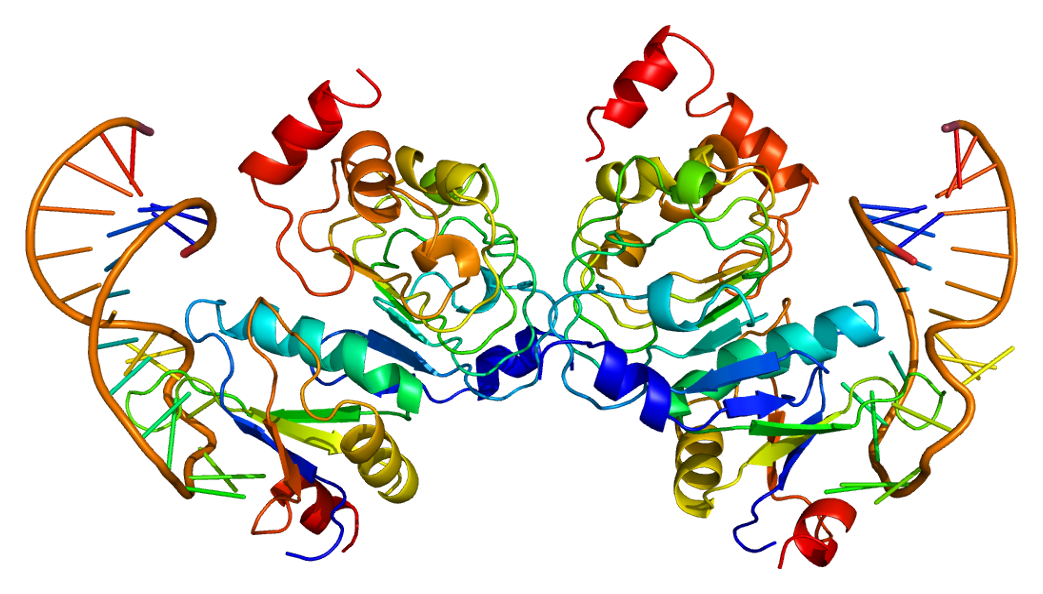

Identifiers
- Aliases: SNRPA1, Lea1, small nuclear ribonucleoprotein polypeptide A', U2A'
- External IDs: OMIM: 603521; MGI: 1916231; GeneCards: SNRPA1
Available structures
PDB	Ortholog search: PDBe RCSB
PDB	List of PDB id codes 1A9N

Gene location (Mouse)
Chr.	Chromosome 7 (mouse)
Band	7|7 C	Start	65,708,751 bp
Band	7|7 C	End	65,724,335 bp
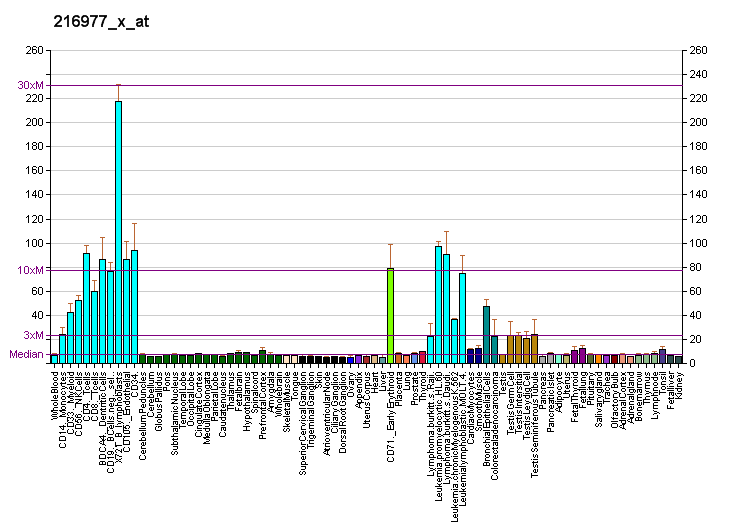

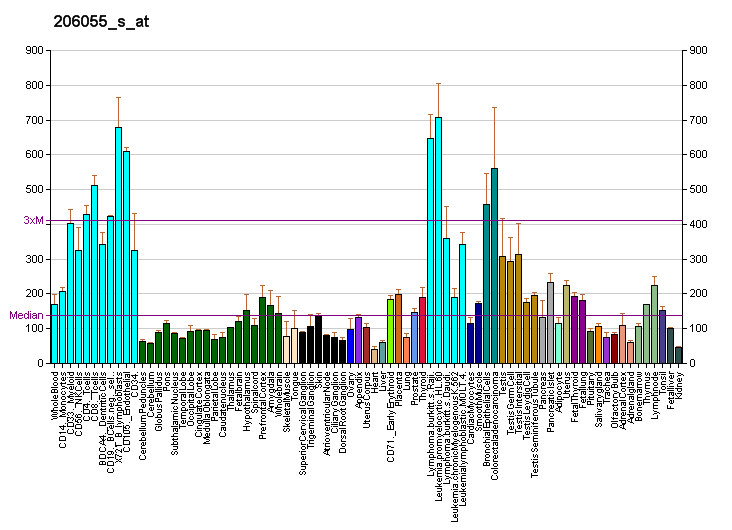

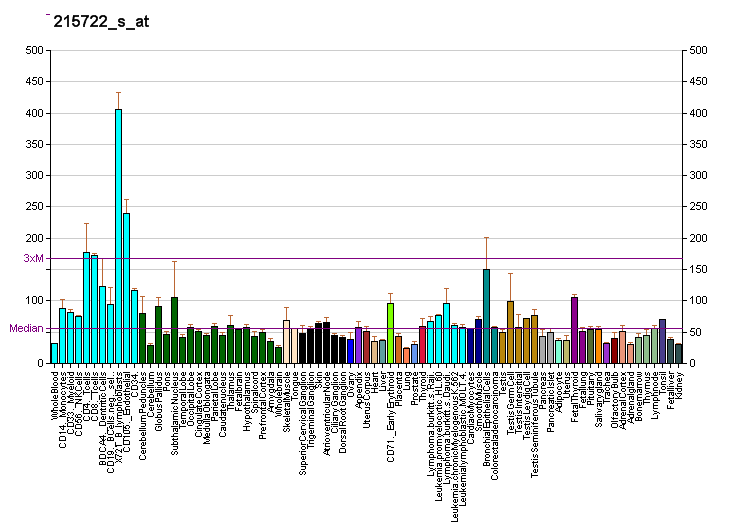
RNA expression pattern
Bgee	Human / Mouse (ortholog); Top expressed in: skin of abdomen; lymph node; thymus; bone marrow; spleen; monocyte; appendix; tibial nerve; right lung; rectum / Top expressed in: primitive streak; Paneth cell; condyle; fossa; abdominal wall; epiblast; superior cervical ganglion; motor neuron; medullary collecting duct; embryo; More reference expression data
BioGPS	More reference expression data
Gene ontology
Molecular function	U2 snRNA binding; protein binding; RNA binding
Cellular component	catalytic step 2 spliceosome; spliceosomal complex; small nuclear ribonucleoprotein complex; nucleus; U2 snRNP; nucleoplasm; nuclear speck; nuclear body; U2-type precatalytic spliceosome; U2-type catalytic step 2 spliceosome; viral nucleocapsid
Biological process	mRNA splicing, via spliceosome; mRNA processing; RNA splicing; interleukin-12-mediated signaling pathway; spermatogenesis
Sources:Amigo / QuickGO
Orthologs
Databases	NCBI: entry
Species	Human	Mouse
Entrez	6627	68981
Ensembl	n/a	ENSMUSG00000030512
UniProt	P09661	P57784
RefSeq (mRNA)	NM_003090	NM_021336
RefSeq (protein)	NP_003081	NP_067311
Location (UCSC)	n/a	Chr 7: 65.71 – 65.72 Mb
PubMed search
- Wikidata
View/Edit Human	View/Edit Mouse

U2 small nuclear ribonucleoprotein A' is a protein that in humans is encoded by the SNRPA1 gene.

== Interactions ==
SNRPA1 has been shown to interact with CDC5L.
