= SF3B4 =

Protein-coding gene in humans

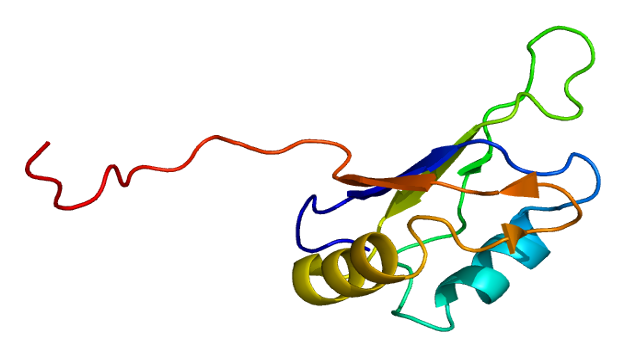

Identifiers
- Aliases: SF3B4, AFD1, Hsh49, SAP49, SF3b49, splicing factor 3b subunit 4
- External IDs: OMIM: 605593; MGI: 109580; GeneCards: SF3B4
Available structures
PDB	Ortholog search: PDBe RCSB
PDB	List of PDB id codes 1X5T, 1X5U

Gene location (Human)
Chr.	Chromosome 1 (human)
Band	1q21.2	Start	149,923,317 bp
Band	1q21.2	End	149,927,803 bp

Gene location (Mouse)
Chr.	Chromosome 3 (mouse)
Band	3|3 F2.1	Start	96,079,648 bp
Band	3|3 F2.1	End	96,084,880 bp
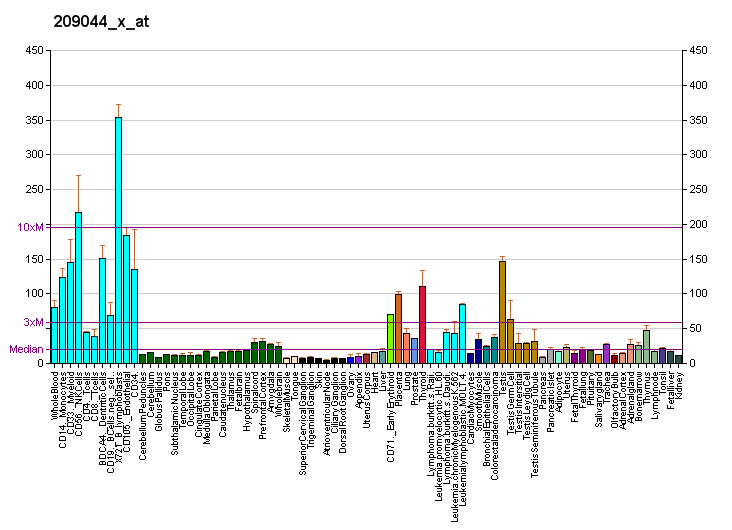
RNA expression pattern
Bgee	Human / Mouse (ortholog); Top expressed in: mucosa of transverse colon; granulocyte; left uterine tube; left testis; right testis; popliteal artery; tibial arteries; monocyte; right coronary artery; olfactory zone of nasal mucosa / Top expressed in: tail of embryo; genital tubercle; epiblast; neural tube; embryo; mesencephalon; embryo; yolk sac; ventricular zone; ganglionic eminence; More reference expression data
BioGPS	More reference expression data
Gene ontology
Molecular function	protein binding; nucleic acid binding; RNA binding
Cellular component	U12-type spliceosomal complex; nucleus; nucleoplasm; spliceosomal complex; nucleolus; U2-type precatalytic spliceosome; ribonucleoprotein complex
Biological process	RNA splicing, via transesterification reactions; mRNA splicing, via spliceosome; positive regulation of mRNA splicing, via spliceosome; mRNA processing; RNA splicing
Sources:Amigo / QuickGO
Orthologs
Databases	NCBI: entry; OMA: entry
Species	Human	Mouse
Entrez	10262	107701
Ensembl	ENSG00000143368	ENSMUSG00000068856
UniProt	Q15427; Q5SZ64	Q8QZY9
RefSeq (mRNA)	NM_005850	NM_153053
RefSeq (protein)	NP_005841	NP_694693
Location (UCSC)	Chr 1: 149.92 – 149.93 Mb	Chr 3: 96.08 – 96.08 Mb
PubMed search
- Wikidata
View/Edit Human	View/Edit Mouse

Splicing factor 3B subunit 4 is a protein that in humans is encoded by the SF3B4 gene.

== Function ==
This gene encodes one of four subunits of the splicing factor 3b. The protein encoded by this gene cross-links to a region in the pre-mRNA immediately upstream of the branchpoint sequence in pre-mRNA in the prespliceosomal complex A. It also may be involved in the assembly of the B, C and E spliceosomal complexes. In addition to RNA-binding activity, this protein interacts directly and highly specifically with subunit 2 of the splicing factor 3B. This protein contains two N-terminal RNA-recognition motifs (RRMs), consistent with the observation that it binds directly to pre-mRNA.

== Disease associations ==
In 2012, Canadian researchers belonging to the FORGE (Finding of Rare disease GEnes) consortium identified new dominant mutations in SF3B4 as the cause of Nager syndrome, a rare type of mandibulofacial dysostosis with associated limb malformations.

== Interactions ==
SF3B4 has been shown to interact with CDC5L, BMPR1A and SF3B2.
