= MIAT (gene) =

Identifiers
- Aliases: MIAT, C22orf35, GOMAFU, LINC00066, NCRNA00066, RNCR2, lncRNA-myocardial infarction associated transcript (non-protein coding), myocardial infarction associated transcript
- External IDs: OMIM: 611082; GeneCards: MIAT

Gene location (Human)
Chr.	Chromosome 22 (human)
Band	22q12.1	Start	26,646,411 bp
Band	22q12.1	End	26,676,475 bp
RNA expression pattern
Bgee	Human / Mouse (ortholog); Top expressed in: primary visual cortex; middle temporal gyrus; Brodmann area 23; superior frontal gyrus; postcentral gyrus; Brodmann area 46; right frontal lobe; lateral nuclear group of thalamus; dorsolateral prefrontal cortex; Brodmann area 9 / n/a; More reference expression data
BioGPS	n/a
Orthologs
Databases	NCBI: entry; OMA: entry
Species	Human	Mouse
Entrez	440823	n/a
Ensembl	ENSG00000225783	n/a
UniProt	n a	n/a
RefSeq (mRNA)	n/a	n/a
RefSeq (protein)	n/a	n/a
Location (UCSC)	Chr 22: 26.65 – 26.68 Mb	n/a
PubMed search		n/a
- Wikidata
View/Edit Human

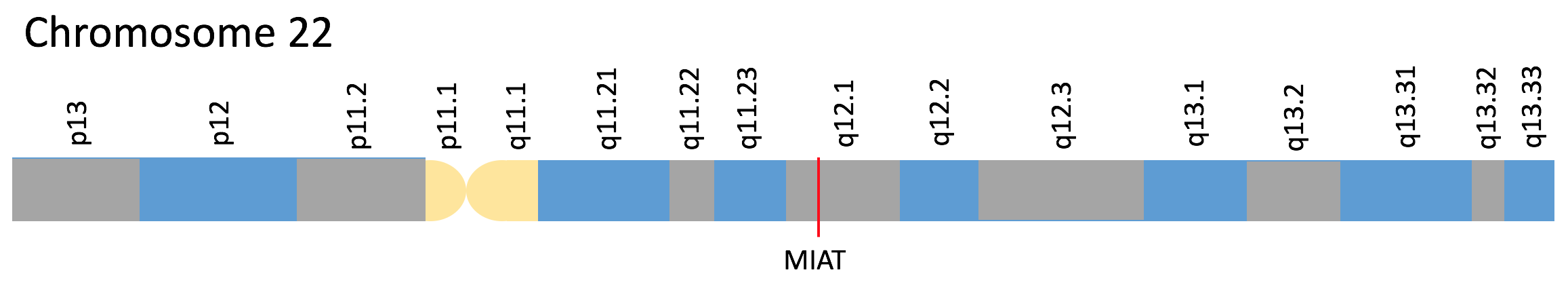
Location of MIAT within Chromosome 22

MIAT (myocardial infarction-associated transcript), also known as RNCR2 (retinal non-coding RNA 2) or Gomafu, is a long non-coding RNA. Single nucleotide polymorphisms (SNPs) in MIAT are associated with a risk of myocardial infarction. It is expressed in neurons, and located in the nucleus. It plays a role in the regulation of retinal cell fate specification. Crea and collaborators have shown that MIAT is highly up-regulated in aggressive prostate cancer samples, raising the possibility that this gene plays a role in cancer progression.

== Structure ==
The MIAT gene is located on Chromosome 22 and is 30,051 bases in length. MIAT's other name, gomafu, is a word in Japanese that means “spotted pattern”. The reason it is named as so is because Gomafu is distributed in the nucleoplasm in a spotted pattern. Moreover, its orientation is a plus strand.

It is also found that MIAT has five exons and is likely to be a functional RNA, since MIAT hasn’t been shown to encode any translational product. Furthermore, the gene encodes a spliced, long non-coding RNA.

The gene is found not only in humans, but also in mice and rats. Orthologs are present in syntenic positions of frog and chicken. It is also found that all gomafu RNA contain tandem repeats of UACUAAC that binds to SPF1, which is a splicing factor.

MIAT was originally discovered as long intergenic noncoding RNAs quite enriched in specific neurons in mouse retina and later more widely expressed in the nervous system and cultured neurons, where it specifies cell identity. Moreover, the gomafu RNA is also quite insoluble and is enriched in PolyA^{+}. Also, there are putative polyadenylation signals (ATTAAA) found at the 3’ end of this gene. The presence of a PolyA tail and multiple exons and introns fulfills the feature of mRNAs transcribed by RNA polymerase II. The stability of the gene is not significantly different from β-actin mRNA.

== Clinical significance ==
=== Myocardial infarction ===
Myocardial infarction is more commonly known as a heart attack. It is the irreversible death of the heart muscle due to prolonged obstruction of blood supply to the organ. Case-controlled large scale studies utilizing Single Nucleotide Polymorphisms(SNPs) throughout the genome demonstrated that altered expression at 6 SNPs in the MIAT gene might confer genetic susceptibility to myocardial infarctions. MIAT has been demonstrated to encode a nonfunctional RNA. Although the exact function of MIAT is still unclear, knowledge of some of the genetic factors that contribute to the pathogenesis of myocardial infarction can lend itself to better diagnosis, prevention, and treatment. Despite all that has been discovered about MIAT, a causal link between MIAT and myocardial infarctions has not yet been demonstrated.

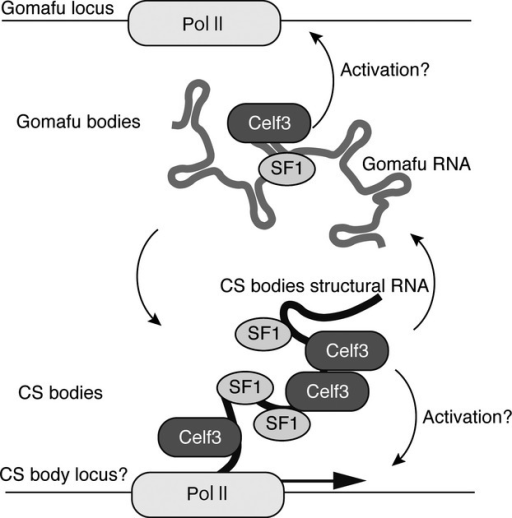
Model of the molecular mechanism of Gomafu

Additionally, one study demonstrated that expression levels of MIAT are shown to change in peripheral blood cells of patients with acute myocardial infarction. In particular, researchers studied the association between levels of lncRNAs and inflammation markers in patients who have suffered a myocardial infarction. MIAT levels were found to be positively associated with lymphocytes and negatively associated with neutrophils and platelets. In another portion of this study, researchers looked at the association between cardiovascular risk factors and levels of lncRNAs. Smoking was a cardiovascular risk factor that was found to be positively associated with MIAT. Several researchers have reported that levels of lncRNAs are regulated in the cardiac tissue following a heart attack, but it is not known for sure whether it is the myocardial infarction that affects the levels of lncRNAs in peripheral blood cells. MIAT has various genotypes of SNPs and it is possible that only one of them relates to heart disease.

=== Schizophrenia ===
The long non-coding RNA(lncRNA) MIAT is located in the same chromosomal region which is linked to Schizophrenia (SZ) 22Q12.1.

MIAT is upregulated in the nucleus accumbens of cocaine and heroin users. The nucleus accumbens is a region involved in behavior and addiction, suggesting that dysregulation of MIAT can influence behavior.

It is well accepted that alternative splicing has a role in SZ pathology. MIAT is associated with alternative splicing through its interaction with splicing factor 1(SF1) and with genes DISC1 and ERBB4. MIAT binds directly to the splicing regulator quaking homolog (QKI) and serine/arginine-rich splicing factor 1 (SRSF1). QKI gene expression is decreased in specific brain regions in SZ and it has been proposed to be involved in SZ.

Post -mortem SZ brains have upregulated expression of both DISC1 and ERBB4. Overexpression of MIAT in human-induced pluripotent stem cell (HiPSC)-derived neurons shows a significant decrease in expression of both DISC1 and ERBB4 and their alternative spliced variants. This is opposite to the upregulated expression seen in SZ patient brains. ASO mediated knockdown of MIAT in (HiPSC)-derived neurons increase the expression of both DISC1 and ERBB4 splice variants, but not their unspliced transcripts. This is almost exactly matching the aberrant splicing pattern seen in post-mortem SZ patient’s brains. These results suggests that loss of function mutations or decreased expression of MIAT is involved in driving aberrant cortical splicing patterns observed in SZ post-mortem brains.

=== Other pathologies ===
MIAT up-regulation and down-regulation has been linked to various types of cancer and other pathologies.

In a study of glioblastoma multiforme, increased expression of MIAT was linked to increased survival rates. In addition, the glioma cells were found to how significantly down-regulated MIAT. The role of MIAT in lymphocytic leukemia is very different from that of glioblastoma. In certain aggressive cell lines of chronic lymphocytic leukemias, MIAT is upregulated and depends on the presence of a transcriptional regulator, OCT4. OCT4 serves a positive regulator of MIAT transcription and as of now is the only known regulator. However, analysis of relative concentrations of MIAT and OCT4 have indicated that other regulatory factors are in play.

Beyond its role in cancer, MIAT misexpression has also been linked to neurovascular dysfunction.
