= TTF2 =

Protein-coding gene in humans

Identifiers
- Aliases: TTF2, HuF2, ZGRF6, transcription termination factor, RNA polymerase II, transcription termination factor 2, F2
- External IDs: OMIM: 604718; MGI: 1921294; GeneCards: TTF2

Gene location (Human)
Chr.	Chromosome 1 (human)
Band	1p13.1	Start	117,060,326 bp
Band	1p13.1	End	117,107,453 bp

Gene location (Mouse)
Chr.	Chromosome 3 (mouse)
Band	3|3 F2.2	Start	100,938,860 bp
Band	3|3 F2.2	End	100,969,663 bp
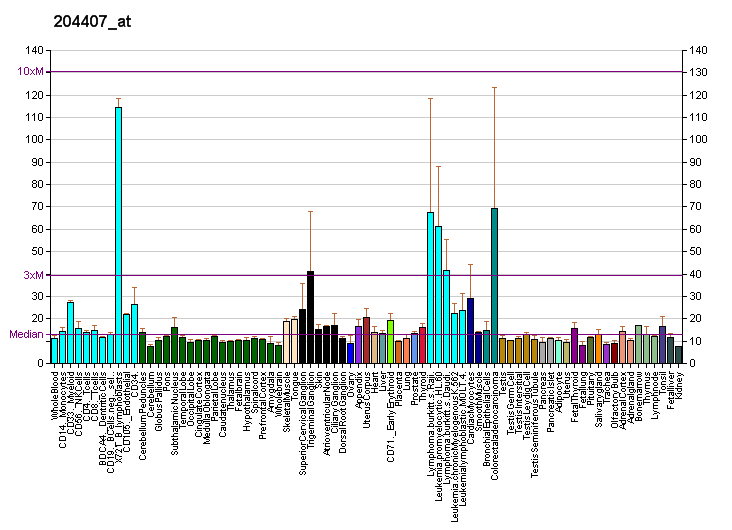
RNA expression pattern
Bgee	Human / Mouse (ortholog); Top expressed in: sural nerve; epithelium of colon; Achilles tendon; bone marrow cell; gonad; rectum; epithelium of nasopharynx; appendix; mucosa of esophagus; testicle / Top expressed in: hand; primitive streak; medullary collecting duct; epiblast; otic vesicle; mandibular prominence; maxillary prominence; hair follicle; endothelial cell of lymphatic vessel; ventricular zone; More reference expression data
BioGPS	More reference expression data
Gene ontology
Molecular function	DNA binding; nucleotide binding; ATP-dependent activity, acting on DNA; zinc ion binding; protein binding; ATP binding; helicase activity; hydrolase activity
Cellular component	spliceosomal complex; transcription elongation factor complex; nucleus; cytoplasm; cytosol
Biological process	DNA-templated transcription, termination; termination of RNA polymerase II transcription; mRNA processing; regulation of transcription, DNA-templated; RNA splicing; transcription, DNA-templated
Sources:Amigo / QuickGO
Orthologs
Databases	NCBI: entry; OMA: entry
Species	Human	Mouse
Entrez	8458	74044
Ensembl	ENSG00000116830	ENSMUSG00000033222
UniProt	Q9UNY4	Q5NC05
RefSeq (mRNA)	NM_003594	NM_001013026
RefSeq (protein)	NP_003585	NP_001013044
Location (UCSC)	Chr 1: 117.06 – 117.11 Mb	Chr 3: 100.94 – 100.97 Mb
PubMed search
- Wikidata
View/Edit Human	View/Edit Mouse

Transcription termination factor 2 is a protein that in humans is encoded by the TTF2 gene.

This gene encodes a member of the SWI2/SNF2 family of proteins, which play a critical role in altering protein-DNA interactions. The encoded protein has been shown to have dsDNA-dependent ATPase activity and RNA polymerase II termination activity. This protein interacts with cell division cycle 5-like, associates with human splicing complexes, and plays a role in pre-mRNA splicing.

== Interactions ==
TTF2 has been shown to interact with CDC5L.
