= DDX42 =

Protein-coding gene in the species Homo sapiens

Identifiers
- Aliases: DDX42, DDX42P, RHELP, RNAHP, SF3B8, SF3b125, DEAD-box helicase 42
- External IDs: OMIM: 613369; MGI: 1919297; GeneCards: DDX42
Enzyme activity
| EC # | BRENDA | ExPASy | KEGG | MetaCyc |
|---|---|---|---|---|
| 3.6.4.13 | ↗ | ↗ | ↗ | ↗ |

Gene location (Human)
| Chr. | Chromosome 17 (human) |
| Band | 17q23.3 | Start | 63,773,603 bp |
| Band | 17q23.3 | End | 63,819,317 bp |

Gene location (Mouse)
| Chr. | Chromosome 11 (mouse) |
| Band | 11|11 E1 | Start | 106,216,926 bp |
| Band | 11|11 E1 | End | 106,249,139 bp |
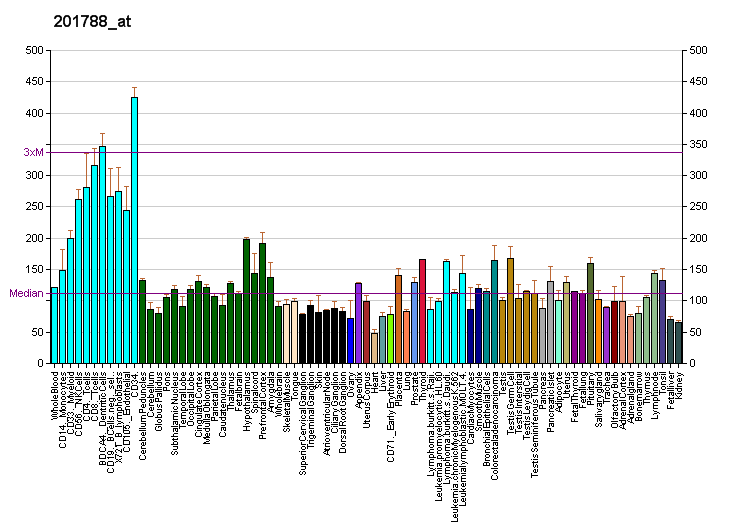
RNA expression pattern
| Bgee | Human / Mouse (ortholog); Top expressed in: body of pancreas; right uterine tube; gastric mucosa; left ovary; right ovary; epithelium of colon; Achilles tendon; canal of the cervix; sural nerve; minor salivary glands / Top expressed in: neural layer of retina; ventricular zone; tail of embryo; neural tube; epiblast; dentate gyrus of hippocampal formation granule cell; lens; superior frontal gyrus; yolk sac; thymus; More reference expression data |
| BioGPS | More reference expression data |
Gene ontology
| Molecular function | nucleotide binding; protein binding; hydrolase activity; ATP binding; helicase activity; nucleic acid binding; RNA binding |
| Cellular component | cytoplasm; Cajal body; membrane; nucleus; nucleoplasm; cytosol; nuclear speck; nucleolus |
| Biological process | protein localization; RNA secondary structure unwinding; mRNA splicing, via spliceosome; regulation of apoptotic process |
Sources:Amigo / QuickGO
Orthologs
| Databases | NCBI: entry; OMA: entry |
| Species | Human | Mouse |
| Entrez | 11325 | 72047 |
| Ensembl | ENSG00000198231 | ENSMUSG00000020705 |
| UniProt | Q86XP3 | Q810A7 |
| RefSeq (mRNA) | NM_007372; NM_203499 | NM_028074 |
| RefSeq (protein) | NP_031398; NP_987095 | NP_082350; NP_001348569; NP_001348571; NP_001348572; NP_001348573 |
| Location (UCSC) | Chr 17: 63.77 – 63.82 Mb | Chr 11: 106.22 – 106.25 Mb |
| PubMed search |
- Wikidata
| View/Edit Human | View/Edit Mouse |

ATP-dependent RNA helicase DDX42 is an enzyme that in humans is encoded by the DDX42 gene.

== Function ==
This gene encodes a member of the Asp-Glu-Ala-Asp (DEAD) box protein family. Members of this protein family are putative RNA helicases, and are implicated in a number of cellular processes involving alteration of RNA secondary structure such as translation initiation, nuclear and mitochondrial splicing, and ribosome and spliceosome assembly. Members of this family are believed to be involved in embryogenesis, spermatogenesis, and cellular growth and division. Two transcript variants encoding the same protein have been identified for this gene.

== Interactions ==
DDX42 has been shown to interact with SF3B1.
