= SF3B2 =

Protein-coding gene in the species Homo sapiens

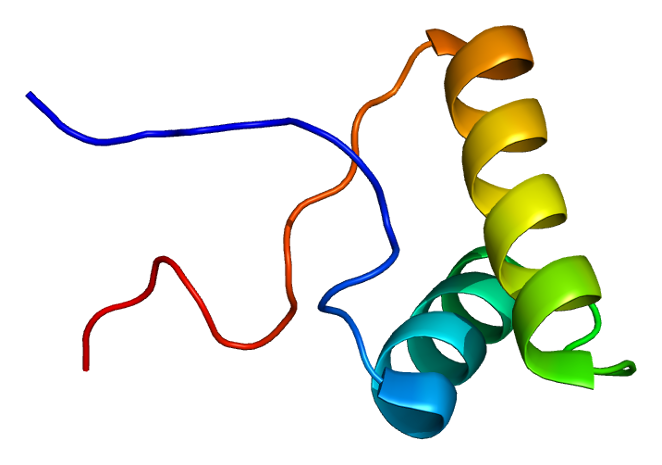

Identifiers
- Aliases: SF3B2, Cus1, SAP145, SF3B145, SF3b1, SF3b150, splicing factor 3b subunit 2, CFM
- External IDs: OMIM: 605591; MGI: 2441856; GeneCards: SF3B2
Available structures
PDB	Ortholog search: PDBe RCSB
PDB	List of PDB id codes 2DO5

Gene location (Human)
Chr.	Chromosome 11 (human)
Band	11q13.1	Start	66,050,729 bp
Band	11q13.1	End	66,069,308 bp

Gene location (Mouse)
Chr.	Chromosome 19 (mouse)
Band	19|19 A	Start	5,323,960 bp
Band	19|19 A	End	5,345,483 bp
RNA expression pattern
Bgee	Human / Mouse (ortholog); Top expressed in: ventricular zone; left testis; right testis; anterior pituitary; right uterine tube; ganglionic eminence; right lobe of thyroid gland; left lobe of thyroid gland; right hemisphere of cerebellum; body of uterus / Top expressed in: Rostral migratory stream; external carotid artery; internal carotid artery; supraoptic nucleus; condyle; conjunctival fornix; fossa; substantia nigra; motor neuron; primitive streak; More reference expression data
BioGPS	n/a
Gene ontology
Molecular function	protein binding; RNA binding
Cellular component	catalytic step 2 spliceosome; spliceosomal complex; U2-type spliceosomal complex; U12-type spliceosomal complex; precatalytic spliceosome; nucleus; U2 snRNP; nucleoplasm; nuclear speck; U2-type precatalytic spliceosome
Biological process	mRNA splicing, via spliceosome; mRNA processing; viral process; RNA splicing
Sources:Amigo / QuickGO
Orthologs
Databases	NCBI: entry; OMA: entry
Species	Human	Mouse
Entrez	10992	319322
Ensembl	ENSG00000087365	ENSMUSG00000024853
UniProt	Q13435	Q3UJB0
RefSeq (mRNA)	NM_006842	NM_030109; NM_001362454
RefSeq (protein)	NP_006833	NP_084385; NP_001349383
Location (UCSC)	Chr 11: 66.05 – 66.07 Mb	Chr 19: 5.32 – 5.35 Mb
PubMed search
- Wikidata
View/Edit Human	View/Edit Mouse

Splicing factor 3B subunit 2 is a protein that in humans is encoded by the SF3B2 gene.

== Function ==
This gene encodes subunit 2 of the splicing factor 3b protein complex. Splicing factor 3b, together with splicing factor 3a and a 12S RNA unit, forms the U2 small nuclear ribonucleoproteins complex (U2 snRNP). The splicing factor 3b/3a complex binds pre-mRNA upstream of the intron's branch site in a sequence-independent manner and may anchor the U2 snRNP to the pre-mRNA. Splicing factor 3b is also a component of the minor U12-type spliceosome. Subunit 2 associates with pre-mRNA upstream of the branch site at the anchoring site. Subunit 2 also interacts directly with subunit 4 of the splicing factor 3b complex. Subunit 2 is a highly hydrophilic protein with a proline-rich N-terminus and a glutamate-rich stretch in the C-terminus.

== Interactions ==
SF3B2 has been shown to interact with SF3B4, RBM7, SF3B1 and CDC5L.
