= 40S ribosomal protein S25 =

Protein-coding gene in the species Homo sapiens

RPS25

Identifiers
- Aliases: RPS25, S25, ribosomal protein S25
- External IDs: OMIM: 180465; MGI: 1922867; GeneCards: RPS25
Available structures
PDB	Ortholog search: PDBe RCSB
PDB	List of PDB id codes 4UG0, 4V6X, 5A2Q, 5AJ0, 5FLX

Gene location (Human)
Chr.	Chromosome 11 (human)
Band	11q23.3	Start	119,015,712 bp
Band	11q23.3	End	119,018,691 bp

Gene location (Mouse)
Chr.	Chromosome 9 (mouse)
Band	9|9 A5.2	Start	44,318,436 bp
Band	9|9 A5.2	End	44,321,724 bp
RNA expression pattern
Bgee	Human / Mouse (ortholog); Top expressed in: left ovary; right ovary; Achilles tendon; pituitary gland; anterior pituitary; right uterine tube; gastric mucosa; thyroid gland; left lobe of thyroid gland; right lobe of thyroid gland / Top expressed in: morula; embryo; blastocyst; embryo; ventricular zone; yolk sac; lip; genital tubercle; tail of embryo; granulocyte; More reference expression data
BioGPS	n/a
Gene ontology
Molecular function	protein binding; RNA binding; structural constituent of ribosome
Cellular component	cytosol; ribosome; cytosolic small ribosomal subunit; nucleolus; small ribosomal subunit; extracellular exosome; nucleus; nucleoplasm; extracellular matrix; postsynaptic density
Biological process	viral transcription; SRP-dependent cotranslational protein targeting to membrane; translational initiation; nuclear-transcribed mRNA catabolic process, nonsense-mediated decay; rRNA processing; protein biosynthesis
Sources:Amigo / QuickGO
Orthologs
Databases	NCBI: entry; OMA: entry
Species	Human	Mouse
Entrez	6230	75617
Ensembl	ENSG00000118181	ENSMUSG00000009927
UniProt	P62851	P62852
RefSeq (mRNA)	NM_001028	NM_024266
RefSeq (protein)	NP_001019	NP_077228
Location (UCSC)	Chr 11: 119.02 – 119.02 Mb	Chr 9: 44.32 – 44.32 Mb
PubMed search
- Wikidata
View/Edit Human	View/Edit Mouse

40S ribosomal protein S25 (eS25) is a protein that in humans is encoded by the RPS25 gene.

Ribosomes are cellular macromolecules that catalyze protein synthesis across all kingdoms of life. The eukaryotic ribosome consists of a small 40S subunit and a large 60S subunit. Together these subunits are composed of 4 RNA species and approximately 80 distinct proteins. The RPS25 gene encodes the eukaryote-specific ribosomal protein eS25 that is a component of the 40S subunit. As is typical for genes encoding ribosomal proteins, there are multiple processed pseudogenes of this gene dispersed through the genome.

== Interactions ==
Besides the interactions that position eS25 at its location in the E site region of the 40S ribosomal subunit, eS25 has been suggested to interact with other cellular proteins. One study has found that eS25 interacts with MDM2 as part of a regulatory feedback loop that stabilizes p53. Additionally, eS25 has been shown to interact with CDC5L.

== Function ==
As a ribosomal protein, eS25 likely plays a role in general protein synthesis; however, the RPS25 gene is non-essential for cellular viability in budding yeast and in select mammalian cell lines, implying that it is not essential for eukaryotic protein synthesis. Studies have implicated eS25 in the control of several specialized forms of translation, including that mediated by viral IRESs.

== See also ==
- Eukaryotic translation
- 40S ribosomal subunit
- IRES
