= ILF2 =

Protein-coding gene in humans

Identifiers
- Aliases: ILF2, NF45, PRO3063, interleukin enhancer binding factor 2
- External IDs: OMIM: 603181; MGI: 1915031; GeneCards: ILF2
Available structures
| PDB | Ortholog search: PDBe RCSB |
| PDB | List of PDB id codes 4AT7, 4AT8, 4AT9, 4ATB |

Gene location (Mouse)
| Chr. | Chromosome 3 (mouse) |
| Band | 3|3 F1 | Start | 90,383,433 bp |
| Band | 3|3 F1 | End | 90,395,686 bp |
RNA expression pattern
| Bgee | Human / Mouse (ortholog); Top expressed in: ganglionic eminence; islet of Langerhans; anterior pituitary; rectum; body of pancreas; skin of abdomen; left lobe of thyroid gland; left uterine tube; right lobe of thyroid gland; right adrenal gland / Top expressed in: ventricular zone; tail of embryo; genital tubercle; ganglionic eminence; neural tube; abdominal wall; medial ganglionic eminence; neural layer of retina; epiblast; embryo; More reference expression data |
| BioGPS | n/a |
Gene ontology
| Molecular function | transferase activity; DNA binding; double-stranded RNA binding; protein binding; ATP binding; RNA binding |
| Cellular component | cytoplasm; nucleolus; membrane; nucleus; specific granule lumen; tertiary granule lumen; ficolin-1-rich granule lumen; extracellular region; ribonucleoprotein complex |
| Biological process | positive regulation of transcription, DNA-templated; regulation of transcription, DNA-templated; immune response; transcription, DNA-templated; neutrophil degranulation |
Sources:Amigo / QuickGO
Orthologs
| Databases | NCBI: entry |
| Species | Human | Mouse |
| Entrez | 3608 | 67781 |
| Ensembl | n/a | ENSMUSG00000001016 |
| UniProt | Q12905 | Q9CXY6 |
| RefSeq (mRNA) | NM_004515; NM_001267809 | NM_026374 |
| RefSeq (protein) | NP_001254738; NP_004506 | NP_080650 |
| Location (UCSC) | n/a | Chr 3: 90.38 – 90.4 Mb |
| PubMed search |
- Wikidata
| View/Edit Human | View/Edit Mouse |

Interleukin enhancer-binding factor 2 is a protein that in humans is encoded by the ILF2 gene.

== Function ==
Nuclear factor of activated T-cells (NFAT) is a transcription factor required for T-cell expression of the interleukin 2 gene. NFAT binds to a sequence in the interleukin 2 gene enhancer known as the antigen receptor response element 2. In addition, NFAT can bind RNA and is an essential component for encapsidation and protein priming of hepatitis B viral polymerase. NFAT is a heterodimer of 45 kDa and 90 kDa proteins, the smaller of which is the product of this gene. The encoded protein binds strongly to the 90 kDa protein and stimulates its ability to enhance gene expression.

== Interactions ==
ILF2 has been shown to interact with CDC5L and DNA-PKcs.

ILF2 and ILF3 have been identified as autoantigens in mice with induced lupus, in canine systemic rheumatic autoimmune disease, and as a rare finding in humans with autoimmune disease.
