= Streptomyces chromofuscus =

Scientific classification
- Domain: Bacteria
- Kingdom: Bacillati
- Phylum: Actinomycetota
- Class: Actinomycetes
- Order: Streptomycetales
- Family: Streptomycetaceae
- Genus: Streptomyces
- Species: S. chromofuscus

Binomial name
- Streptomyces chromofuscus (Preobrazhenskaya et al. 1957) Pridham et al. 1958 (Approved Lists 1980)

Type strain
- 13638/58, AS 4.1451, ATCC 23896, BCRC 15125, CBS 682.68, CCRC 15125, CGMCC 4.1451, DSM 40273, IFO 12851, INA 13638/58, ISP 5273, JCM 4354, KCC S-0354, KCTC 19069, Lanoot R-8679, LMG 19317, NBRC 12851, NRRL B-12175, NRRL-ISP 5273, R-8679, RIA 1191, VKM Ac-974

Synonyms
- "Actinomyces chromofuscus" Preobrazhenskaya et al. 1957

Species of bacterium

Streptomyces chromofuscus is a bacterium species from the genus of Streptomyces which has been isolated from soil. Streptomyces chromofuscus produces phospholipase D, herboxidiene, pentalenolactone O and carazostatins.

== See also ==
- List of Streptomyces species
