= Small nuclear ribonucleoprotein polypeptide A =

Protein-coding gene in the species Homo sapiens

SNRPA
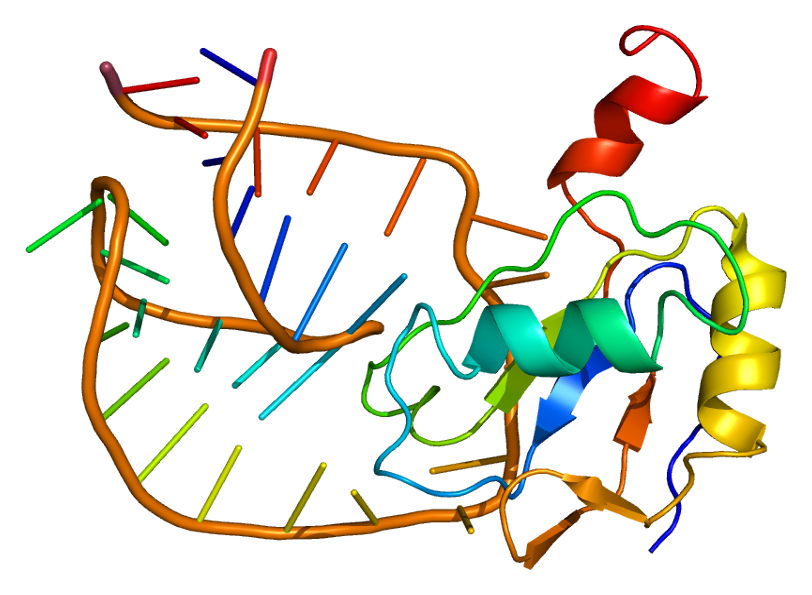

Identifiers
- Aliases: SNRPA, Mud1, U1-A, U1A, Small nuclear ribonucleoprotein polypeptide A
- External IDs: OMIM: 182285; MGI: 1855690; GeneCards: SNRPA
Available structures
PDB	Ortholog search: PDBe RCSB
PDB	List of PDB id codes 1AUD, 1DRZ, 1DZ5, 1FHT, 1M5K, 1M5O, 1M5P, 1M5V, 1NU4, 1OIA, 1SJ3, 1SJ4, 1SJF, 1U6B, 1URN, 1VBX, 1VBY, 1VBZ, 1VC0, 1VC5, 1VC6, 1ZZN, 2A3J, 2NZ4, 2OIH, 2OJ3, 2U1A, 3BO2, 3BO3, 3BO4, 3CUL, 3CUN, 3EGZ, 3G8S, 3G8T, 3G96, 3G9C, 3HHN, 3IIN, 3IRW, 3IWN, 3K0J, 3L3C, 3MUM, 3MUR, 3MUT, 3MUV, 3MXH, 3P49, 3PGW, 3R1H, 3R1L, 3UCU, 3UCZ, 3UD3, 3UD4, 4C4W, 4PR6, 4PRF, 4W90, 4YB1, 5DDO, 5DDR, 5DDQ, 5DDP, 5FJ4

Gene location (Human)
Chr.	Chromosome 19 (human)
Band	19q13.2	Start	40,750,637 bp
Band	19q13.2	End	40,765,389 bp

Gene location (Mouse)
Chr.	Chromosome 7 (mouse)
Band	7|7 A3	Start	26,886,430 bp
Band	7|7 A3	End	26,895,696 bp
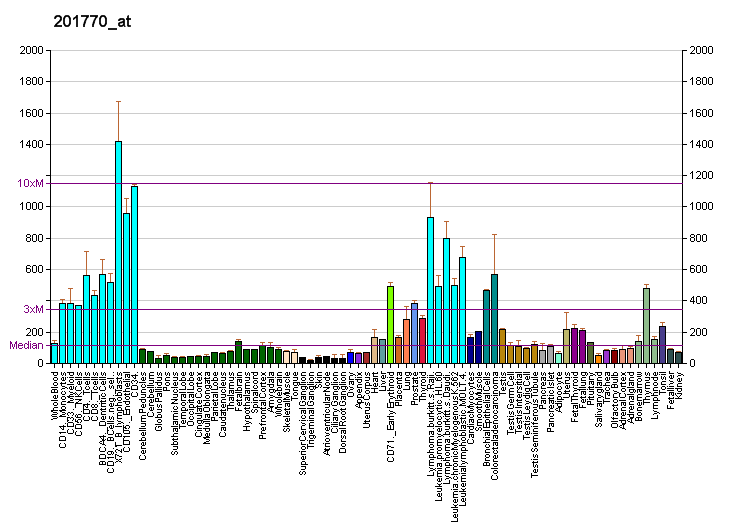
RNA expression pattern
Bgee	Human / Mouse (ortholog); Top expressed in: ganglionic eminence; mucosa of transverse colon; left ovary; ventricular zone; canal of the cervix; right ovary; body of uterus; right lobe of thyroid gland; popliteal artery; tibial arteries / Top expressed in: epiblast; yolk sac; ventricular zone; tail of embryo; neural tube; genital tubercle; ganglionic eminence; embryo; embryo; mesencephalon; More reference expression data
BioGPS	More reference expression data
Gene ontology
Molecular function	U1 snRNA binding; snRNA stem-loop binding; protein binding; RNA binding; nucleic acid binding; U1 snRNP binding; identical protein binding
Cellular component	spliceosomal complex; nucleus; nucleoplasm; U1 snRNP
Biological process	mRNA processing; regulation of mRNA polyadenylation; RNA splicing; mRNA splicing, via spliceosome
Sources:Amigo / QuickGO
Orthologs
Databases	NCBI: entry; OMA: entry
Species	Human	Mouse
Entrez	6626	53607
Ensembl	ENSG00000077312	ENSMUSG00000061479
UniProt	P09012	Q62189
RefSeq (mRNA)	NM_004596	NM_001046637; NM_001285825; NM_015782
RefSeq (protein)	NP_004587	NP_001040102; NP_001272754; NP_056597
Location (UCSC)	Chr 19: 40.75 – 40.77 Mb	Chr 7: 26.89 – 26.9 Mb
PubMed search
- Wikidata
View/Edit Human	View/Edit Mouse

U1 small nuclear ribonucleoprotein A is a protein that in humans is encoded by the SNRPA gene.

== Interactions ==
Small nuclear ribonucleoprotein polypeptide A has been shown to interact with CDC5L.
