= SF3B1 =

Protein-coding gene in humans

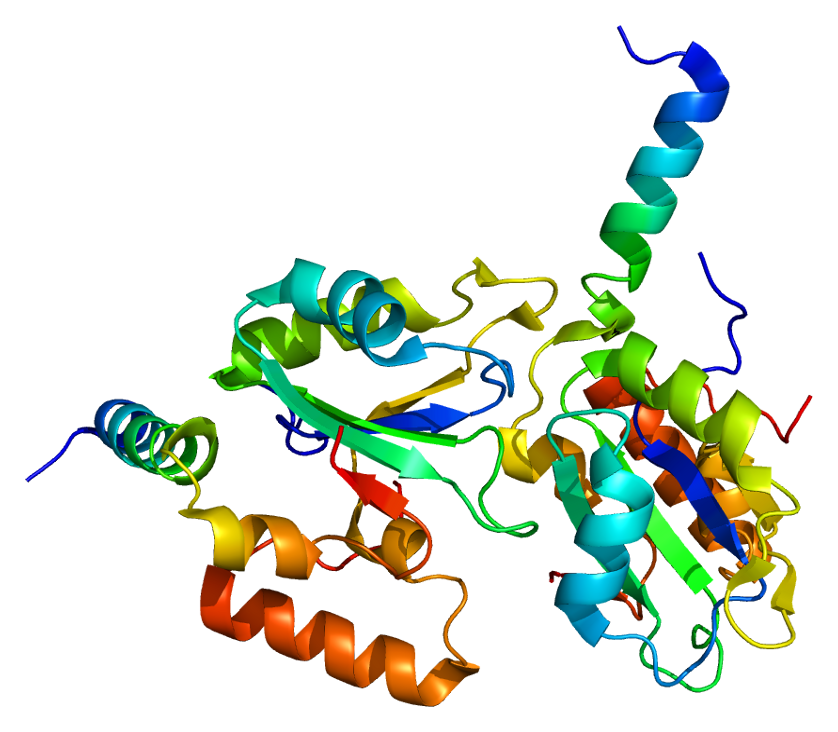

Identifiers
- Aliases: SF3B1, Hsh155, MDS, PRP10, PRPF10, SAP155, SF3b155, splicing factor 3b subunit 1
- External IDs: OMIM: 605590; MGI: 1932339; GeneCards: SF3B1
Available structures
PDB	Ortholog search: PDBe RCSB
PDB	List of PDB id codes 2F9D, 2F9J, 2PEH, 3LQV, 4OZ1, 2FHO

Gene location (Human)
Chr.	Chromosome 2 (human)
Band	2q33.1	Start	197,388,515 bp
Band	2q33.1	End	197,435,079 bp

Gene location (Mouse)
Chr.	Chromosome 1 (mouse)
Band	1 C1.2|1 27.98 cM	Start	54,985,169 bp
Band	1 C1.2|1 27.98 cM	End	55,027,481 bp
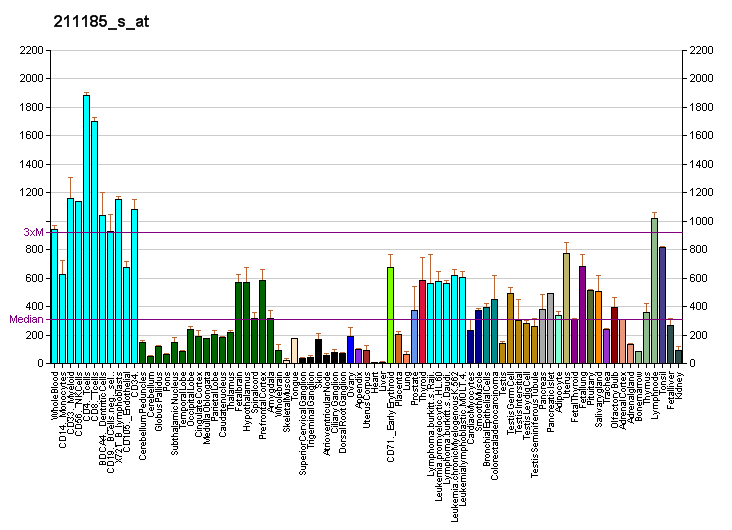

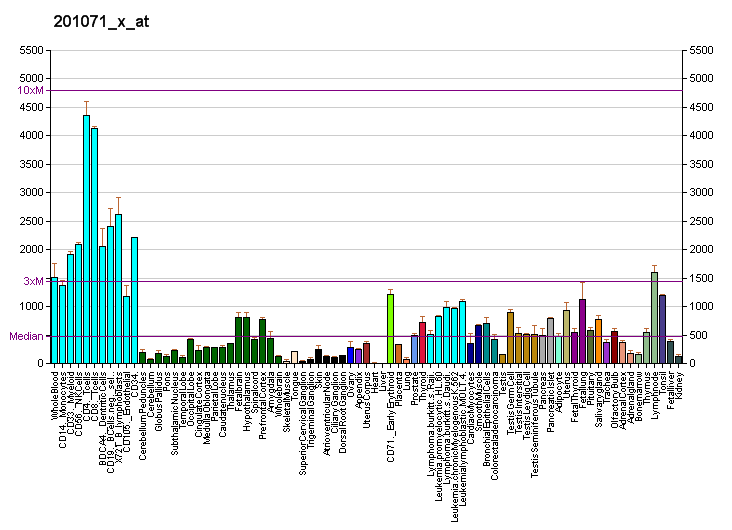
RNA expression pattern
Bgee	Human / Mouse (ortholog); Top expressed in: tibia; ventricular zone; epithelium of nasopharynx; right uterine tube; skin of thigh; skin of hip; left ovary; superficial temporal artery; granulocyte; body of uterus / Top expressed in: Gonadal ridge; hand; Rostral migratory stream; maxillary prominence; aortic valve; ascending aorta; human fetus; mandibular prominence; primitive streak; genital tubercle; More reference expression data
BioGPS	More reference expression data
Gene ontology
Molecular function	protein binding; mRNA binding; RNA binding
Cellular component	U11/U12 snRNP; catalytic step 2 spliceosome; spliceosomal complex; U12-type spliceosomal complex; U2-type prespliceosome; nucleus; U2 snRNP; nucleoplasm; nuclear speck; U2-type precatalytic spliceosome
Biological process	RNA splicing, via transesterification reactions; epigenetic maintenance of chromatin in transcription-competent conformation; mRNA splicing, via spliceosome; spliceosomal complex assembly; mRNA processing; RNA splicing
Sources:Amigo / QuickGO
Orthologs
Databases	NCBI: entry; OMA: entry
Species	Human	Mouse
Entrez	23451	81898
Ensembl	ENSG00000115524	ENSMUSG00000025982
UniProt	O75533	Q99NB9
RefSeq (mRNA)	NM_001005526; NM_001308824; NM_012433	NM_031179
RefSeq (protein)	NP_001005526; NP_001295753; NP_036565	n/a
Location (UCSC)	Chr 2: 197.39 – 197.44 Mb	Chr 1: 54.99 – 55.03 Mb
PubMed search
- Wikidata
View/Edit Human	View/Edit Mouse

Splicing factor 3B subunit 1 is a protein that in humans is encoded by the SF3B1 gene.

== Function ==
This gene encodes subunit 1 of the splicing factor 3b protein complex. Splicing factor 3b, together with splicing factor 3a and U2 spliceosomal RNA, forms the U2 small nuclear ribonucleoproteins complex (U2 snRNP). The splicing factor 3b/3a complex binds pre-mRNA upstream of the intron's branch site in a sequence independent manner and may anchor the U2 snRNP to the pre-mRNA. Splicing factor 3b is also a component of the minor U12-type spliceosome. The carboxy-terminal two-thirds of subunit 1 have 22 non-identical, tandem HEAT repeats that form rod-like, helical structures. Alternative splicing results in multiple transcript variants encoding different isoforms.

== Interactions ==
SF3B1 has been shown to interact with:

- CDC5L,
- DDX42,
- PPP1R8,
- SF3B2,
- SF3B3,
- SF3B6,

== Clinical relevance ==
Mutations in this gene have been recurrently seen in cases of advanced chronic lymphocytic leukemia, myelodysplastic syndromes and breast cancer. SF3B1 mutations are found in the vast majority of myelodysplastic syndrome with ring sideroblasts (MDS-RS) and MDS with ring sideroblasts and thrombocytosis (MDS-RS-T), so much so that mutated SF3B1 has become a diagnostic criterion for these per the 5th edition of the WHO Classification and the International Consensus Classification (ICC).

There is also an emerging body of evidence to suggest implications of SF3B1 mutations being involved in orbital melanoma.

== Inhibitors ==
- H3B-8800
