= Splicing factor =

Proteins that aid in intron removal from messenger RNA

A splicing factor is a protein involved in the removal of introns from strings of messenger RNA, so that the exons can bind together; the process takes place in particles known as spliceosomes. Splicing factors regulate the binding of the snRNPs U1 and U2 to the 3' and 5' ends of the intron during splicing and can either be splicing promoters or splicing repressors.

In a research paper, splicing factors were found to be produced upon application of resveratrol analogues, which induced senescent cells to rejuvenate. The expression of splicing factors may be altered during aging.

== Splicing factor 3b ==
Splicing factor 3b is a protein complex consisting of the following proteins: PHF5A, SF3B1, SF3B2, SF3B3, SF3B4, SF3B5, SF3B6.
