= SREK1 =

Protein-coding gene in the species Homo sapiens

Identifiers
- Aliases: SREK1, SFRS12, SRrp508, SRrp86, splicing regulatory glutamic acid/lysine-rich protein 1, splicing regulatory glutamic acid and lysine rich protein 1
- External IDs: OMIM: 609268; MGI: 2145245; GeneCards: SREK1

Gene location (Human)
Chr.	Chromosome 5 (human)
Band	5q12.3	Start	66,139,971 bp
Band	5q12.3	End	66,183,615 bp

Gene location (Mouse)
Chr.	Chromosome 13 (mouse)
Band	13|13 D1	Start	103,875,856 bp
Band	13|13 D1	End	103,911,116 bp
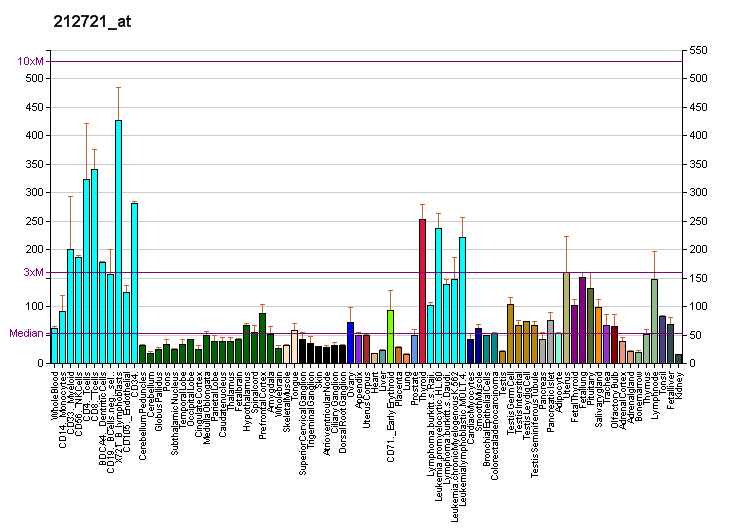
RNA expression pattern
Bgee	Human / Mouse (ortholog); Top expressed in: sural nerve; Achilles tendon; right uterine tube; corpus epididymis; ventricular zone; caput epididymis; body of pancreas; left lobe of thyroid gland; right lobe of thyroid gland; body of uterus / Top expressed in: genital tubercle; tail of embryo; Rostral migratory stream; neural layer of retina; yolk sac; zygote; pineal gland; medullary collecting duct; ventricular zone; lens; More reference expression data
BioGPS	More reference expression data
Gene ontology
Molecular function	protein binding; nucleic acid binding; RNA binding
Cellular component	spliceosomal complex; nucleus; nucleoplasm; nuclear speck
Biological process	mRNA processing; RNA splicing; regulation of alternative mRNA splicing, via spliceosome
Sources:Amigo / QuickGO
Orthologs
Databases	NCBI: entry; OMA: entry
Species	Human	Mouse
Entrez	140890	218543
Ensembl	ENSG00000153914	ENSMUSG00000032621
UniProt	Q8WXA9	Q8BZX4
RefSeq (mRNA)	NM_001077199; NM_001270492; NM_001270493; NM_139168; NM_001323527 NM_001323529; NM_001323533; NM_001323534; NM_001323535	NM_172592; NM_001361085
RefSeq (protein)	NP_001070667; NP_001257421; NP_001310456; NP_001310458; NP_001310462 NP_001310463; NP_001310464; NP_631907	NP_766180; NP_001348014
Location (UCSC)	Chr 5: 66.14 – 66.18 Mb	Chr 13: 103.88 – 103.91 Mb
PubMed search
- Wikidata
View/Edit Human	View/Edit Mouse

Splicing regulatory glutamine/lysine-rich protein 1 is a protein that in humans is encoded by the SREK1 gene (previously SFRS12). The SREK1 protein has been predicted to regulate alternative splicing through its interaction with other splice factors (modulating splice site selection). In particular, it is predicted to inhibit SFRS1, SFRS2, and SFRS6, while promoting the splicing activity of SFRS3.

SREK1/SFRS12 belongs to the superfamily of serine/arginine-rich (SR) splicing factors.
