= NSRP1 =

Protein-coding gene in humans

Identifiers
- Aliases: NSRP1, CCDC55, HSPC095, NSrp70, nuclear speckle splicing regulatory protein 1
- External IDs: OMIM: 616173; MGI: 2144305; GeneCards: NSRP1

Gene location (Human)
Chr.	Chromosome 17 (human)
Band	17q11.2	Start	30,115,521 bp
Band	17q11.2	End	30,186,475 bp

Gene location (Mouse)
Chr.	Chromosome 11 (mouse)
Band	11|11 B5	Start	76,935,118 bp
Band	11|11 B5	End	76,969,261 bp
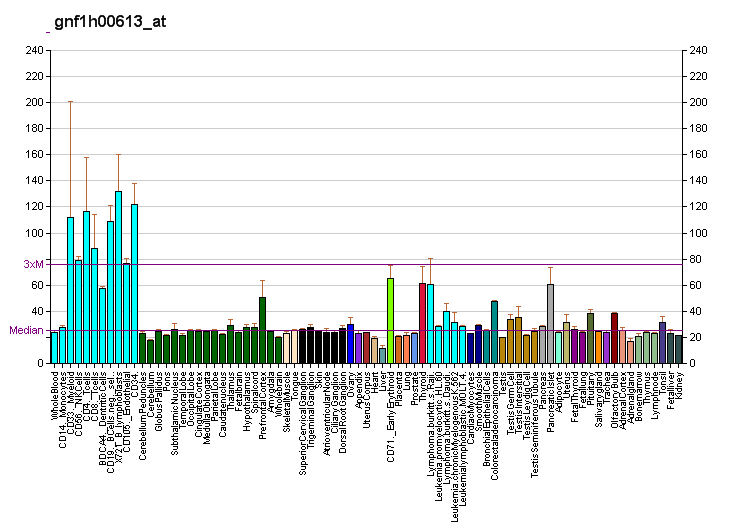
RNA expression pattern
Bgee	Human / Mouse (ortholog); Top expressed in: sural nerve; tibia; parietal pleura; visceral pleura; Achilles tendon; testicle; C1 segment; cartilage tissue; myocardium of left ventricle; epithelium of colon / Top expressed in: zygote; secondary oocyte; otic vesicle; primary oocyte; genital tubercle; hand; Rostral migratory stream; internal carotid artery; supraoptic nucleus; tail of embryo; More reference expression data
BioGPS	More reference expression data
Gene ontology
Molecular function	mRNA binding; protein binding; RNA binding
Cellular component	nucleus; nuclear speck; nucleoplasm; ribonucleoprotein complex
Biological process	RNA splicing; developmental process; regulation of alternative mRNA splicing, via spliceosome; nucleocytoplasmic transport; mRNA processing
Sources:Amigo / QuickGO
Orthologs
Databases	NCBI: entry; OMA: entry
Species	Human	Mouse
Entrez	84081	237859
Ensembl	ENSG00000126653	ENSMUSG00000037958
UniProt	Q9H0G5	Q5NCR9
RefSeq (mRNA)	NM_001033563; NM_001261467; NM_032141	NM_001012309
RefSeq (protein)	NP_001248396; NP_115517	NP_001012309
Location (UCSC)	Chr 17: 30.12 – 30.19 Mb	Chr 11: 76.94 – 76.97 Mb
PubMed search
- Wikidata
View/Edit Human	View/Edit Mouse

Nuclear speckle splicing regulatory protein 1 is a protein that in humans is encoded by the NSRP1 gene.

NSRP1 is located within nuclear speckles. Speckles are dynamic membrane-less organelles within the nucleus and are rich in RNA splicing factors. NSRP1 interacts with other splicing factors including SRSF1 and SRSF2 and modulates pre-mRNA splicing. Knockout of the mouse ortholog Nsrp1 resulted in early embryonic lethality.

Humans with biallelic pathogenic variants in NSRP1 have an autosomal recessive condition called neurodevelopmental disorder with spasticity, seizures, and brain abnormalities (NEDSSBA, MIM 620001). Affected individuals have delayed developmental milestones, axial hypotonia, appendicular spasticity, epilepsy, and often microcephaly. Brain abnormalities including under-opercularization, cerebellar atrophy, and thinning of the corpus callosum can be seen. Patients with NEDSSBA often have a clinical diagnosis of spastic cerebral palsy (CP), and thus NEDSSBA should be considered a CP disease gene.
