= SRPK1 =

Protein-coding gene in the species Homo sapiens

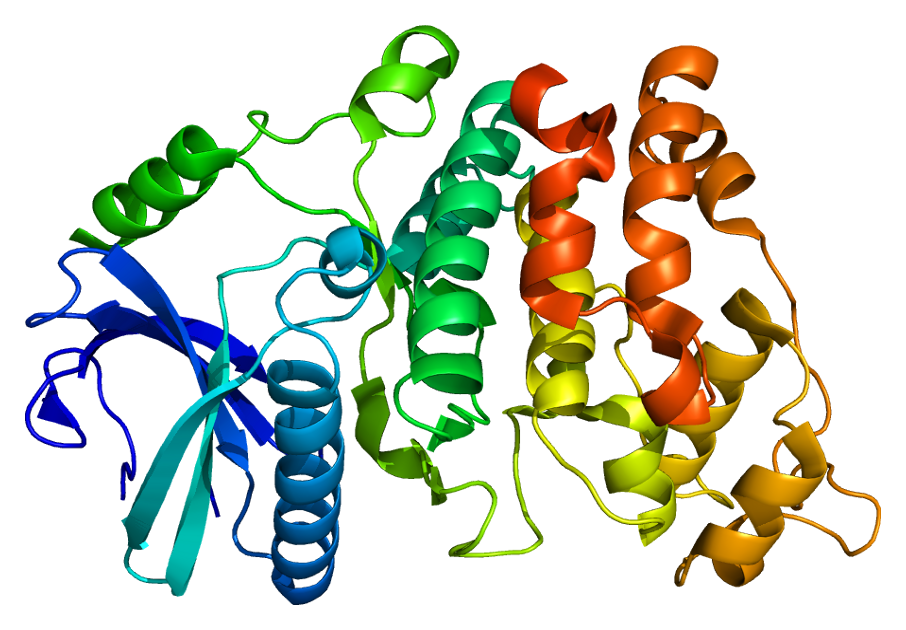

Identifiers
- Aliases: SRPK1, SFRSK1, SRSF protein kinase 1
- External IDs: OMIM: 601939; MGI: 106908; GeneCards: SRPK1
Available structures
PDB	Ortholog search: PDBe RCSB
PDB	List of PDB id codes 1WAK, 1WBP, 3BEG, 4WUA
Enzyme activity
EC #	BRENDA	ExPASy	KEGG	MetaCyc
2.7.11.1	↗	↗	↗	↗

Gene location (Human)
Chr.	Chromosome 6 (human)
Band	6p21.31	Start	35,832,966 bp
Band	6p21.31	End	35,921,342 bp

Gene location (Mouse)
Chr.	Chromosome 17 (mouse)
Band	17|17 A3.3	Start	28,806,622 bp
Band	17|17 A3.3	End	28,841,683 bp
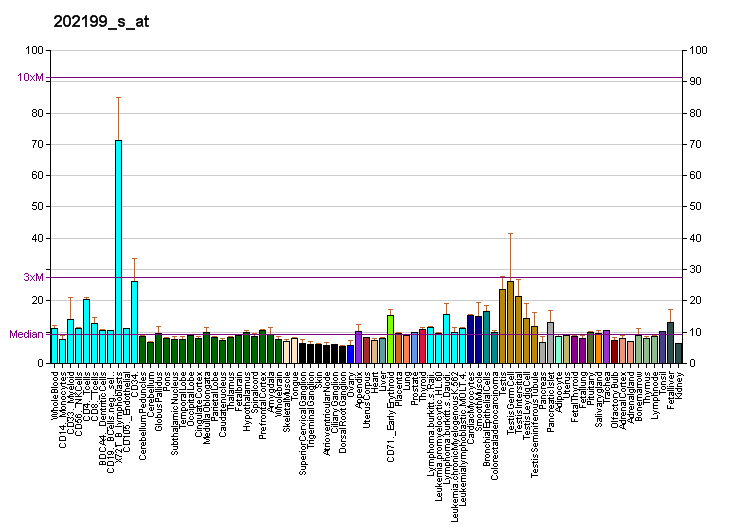

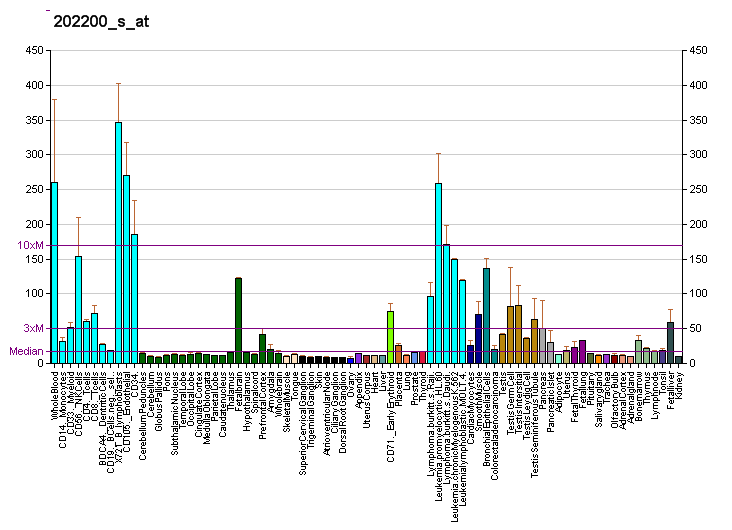
RNA expression pattern
Bgee	Human / Mouse (ortholog); Top expressed in: sperm; trabecular bone; bone marrow; secondary oocyte; endothelial cell; blood; bone marrow cell; human penis; rectum; thymus / Top expressed in: tail of embryo; genital tubercle; morula; secondary oocyte; spermatid; zygote; spermatocyte; primary oocyte; primitive streak; seminiferous tubule; More reference expression data
BioGPS	More reference expression data
Gene ontology
Molecular function	transferase activity; protein kinase activity; nucleotide binding; kinase activity; protein serine/threonine kinase activity; protein binding; ATP binding; magnesium ion binding; RNA binding
Cellular component	cytoplasm; intracellular membrane-bounded organelle; nuclear matrix; plasma membrane; endoplasmic reticulum; nucleus; cytosol
Biological process	cell differentiation; intracellular signal transduction; phosphorylation; regulation of mRNA processing; chromosome segregation; mRNA processing; regulation of mRNA splicing, via spliceosome; protein phosphorylation; negative regulation of viral genome replication; RNA splicing; positive regulation of viral genome replication; innate immune response; viral process; sperm DNA condensation; spliceosomal complex assembly; regulation of gene expression
Sources:Amigo / QuickGO
Orthologs
Databases	NCBI: entry
Species	Human	Mouse
Entrez	6732	20815
Ensembl	n/a	ENSMUSG00000004865
UniProt	Q96SB4	O70551
RefSeq (mRNA)	NM_003137	NM_016795
RefSeq (protein)	NP_003128	NP_058075
Location (UCSC)	Chr 6: 35.83 – 35.92 Mb	Chr 17: 28.81 – 28.84 Mb
PubMed search
- Wikidata
View/Edit Human	View/Edit Mouse

Serine/arginine-Rich Splicing Factor (SRSF) protein kinase-1 SRPK1 is an enzyme that in humans is encoded by the SRPK1 gene.

== Function ==
This gene encodes a serine/arginine protein kinase specific for the SR (serine/arginine-rich domain) family of splicing factors. The protein localizes to the nucleus and the cytoplasm. It is thought to play a role in regulation of both constitutive and alternative splicing by regulating intracellular localization of splicing factors. A second alternatively spliced transcript variant for this gene has been described, but its full length nature has not been determined.

SRPK1 enables angiogenesis, which is regulated by VEGF, which either initiates or inhibits vessel formation depending on alternative splicing.

== Medical applications ==
Some cancers are vascular endothelial growth factor (VEGF) dependant (for angiogenesis). SRPK1 activates (phosphorylates) VEGF splicing factor. SRPK1 inhibitors (e.g. 'SPHINX compounds') are under investigation as treatments for prostate cancer, acute myeloid leukemia and neovascular eye disease.

== Interactions ==
SRPK1 has been shown to interact with:

- ASF/SF2 and
- SNRP70.
- C6orf201
