= Splicing factor 1 =

Protein found in humans

SF1
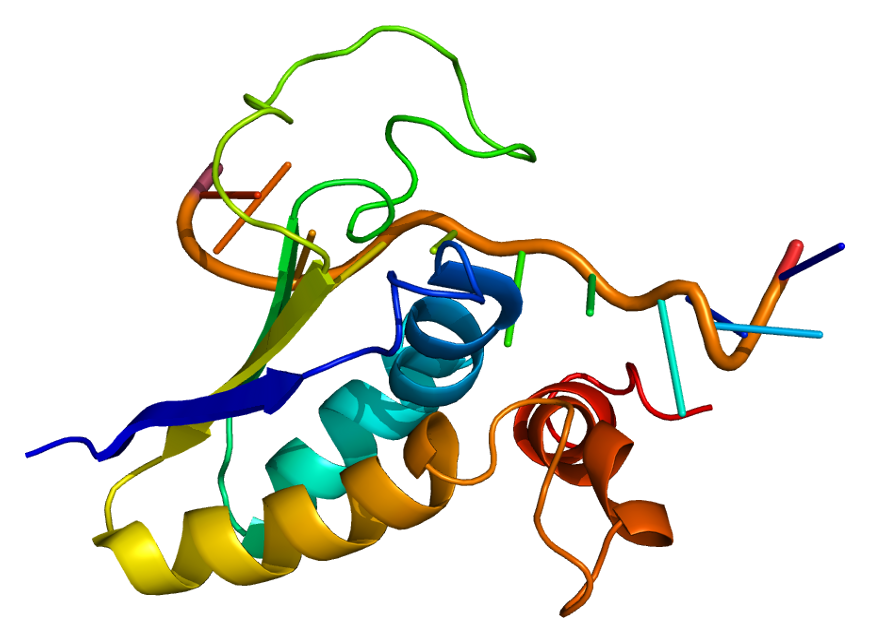

Identifiers
- Aliases: SF1, BBP, D11S636, MBBP, ZCCHC25, ZFM1, ZNF162, splicing factor 1
- External IDs: OMIM: 601516; MGI: 1095403; GeneCards: SF1
Available structures
PDB	Ortholog search: PDBe RCSB
PDB	List of PDB id codes 1K1G, 1O0P, 1OPI, 2M09, 4FXW, 4FXX

Gene location (Human)
Chr.	Chromosome 11 (human)
Band	11q13.1	Start	64,764,606 bp
Band	11q13.1	End	64,778,786 bp
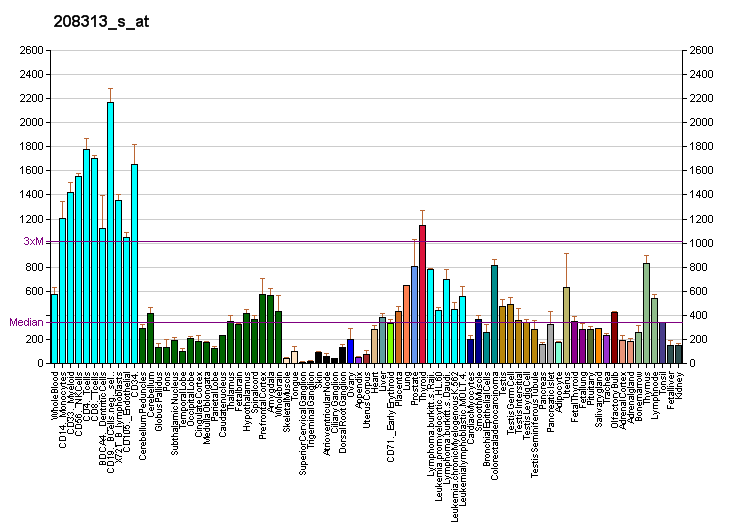
RNA expression pattern
Bgee	Human / Mouse (ortholog); Top expressed in: right uterine tube; left ovary; tibial nerve; gastric mucosa; right ovary; right lobe of thyroid gland; left uterine tube; canal of the cervix; right hemisphere of cerebellum; left lobe of thyroid gland / n/a; More reference expression data
BioGPS	More reference expression data
Gene ontology
Molecular function	transcription corepressor activity; zinc ion binding; metal ion binding; protein binding; nucleic acid binding; identical protein binding; pre-mRNA branch point binding; RNA binding
Cellular component	ribosome; spliceosomal complex; nucleus; nucleoplasm; nuclear body
Biological process	negative regulation of smooth muscle cell proliferation; regulation of transcription, DNA-templated; Leydig cell differentiation; mRNA processing; regulation of steroid biosynthetic process; male sex determination; transcription, DNA-templated; spliceosomal complex assembly; mRNA 3'-splice site recognition; RNA splicing; negative regulation of nucleic acid-templated transcription; mRNA splicing, via spliceosome; nuclear body organization
Sources:Amigo / QuickGO
Orthologs
Databases	NCBI: entry; OMA: entry
Species	Human	Mouse
Entrez	7536	22668
Ensembl	ENSG00000168066	ENSMUSG00000024949
UniProt	Q15637	Q64213
RefSeq (mRNA)	NM_001178030; NM_001178031; NM_004630; NM_201995; NM_201997 NM_201998; NM_001346363; NM_001346364; NM_001346409; NM_001346410; NM_001378956; NM_001378957	NM_001110791; NM_011750
RefSeq (protein)	NP_001171501; NP_001171502; NP_001333292; NP_001333293; NP_001333338 NP_001333339; NP_004621; NP_973724; NP_973726; NP_973727; NP_001365885; NP_001365886	NP_001104261; NP_035880; NP_001347322; NP_001390363; NP_001390364 NP_001390365; NP_001390368; NP_001390369; NP_001390370; NP_001390371; NP_001390372; NP_001390373; NP_001390374; NP_001390375; NP_001390376; NP_001390377; NP_001390378
Location (UCSC)	Chr 11: 64.76 – 64.78 Mb	n/a
PubMed search
- Wikidata
View/Edit Human	View/Edit Mouse

Splicing factor 1 is a protein that in humans is encoded by the SF1 gene (previously ZNF162). This protein is involved in removing introns from pre-mRNA as part of RNA splicing. In yeast, it is also frequently called Branchpoint Binding Protein (BBP), since it binds to the branch point sequence (BPS) of introns.

== Function ==
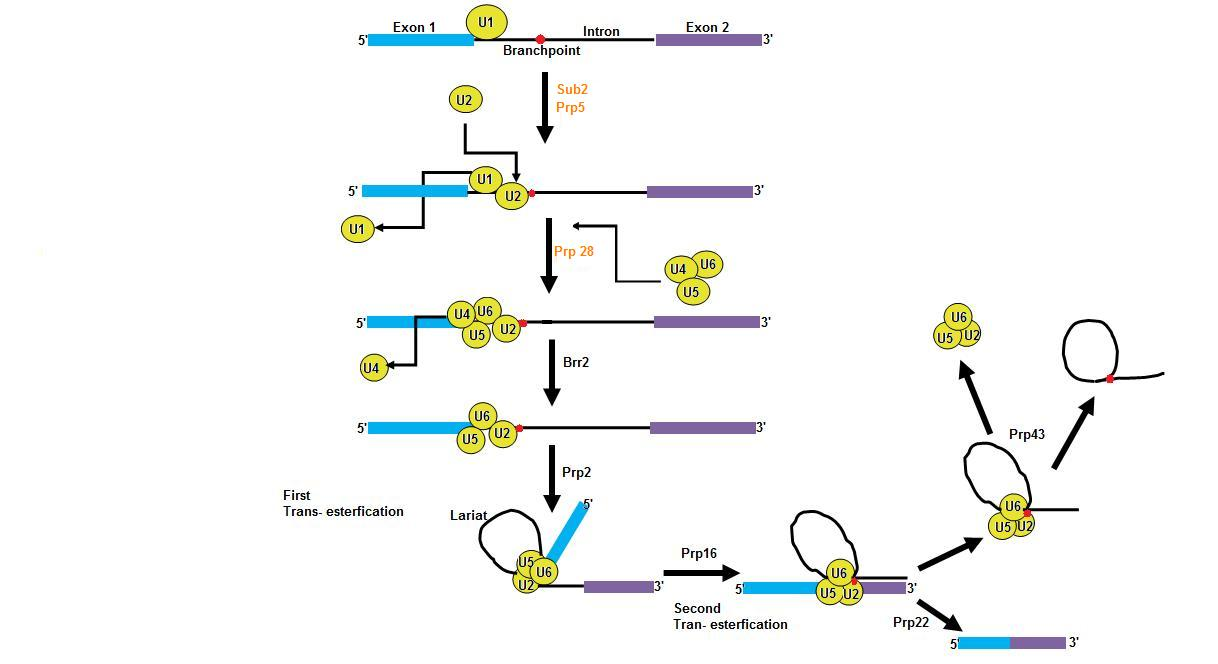
Summary of spliceosome formation. SF1 is involved in U2 binding during the second step.

SF1 is a splicing factor which contributes to the formation of the major spliceosome complex. In particular, after the U2AF1-U2AF2 heterodimer binds to the 3’ end of the intron, SF1 binds to an adjacent motif in the RNA called the branch point sequence (BPS). Afterwards U2 spliceosomal RNA displaces SF1, and itself binds to the BPS.

== In yeast ==
The role of the protein in yeast cells has been the subject of study. The BPS that the protein binds to is UACUAAC.

== Interactions ==
SF1 (gene) has been shown to interact with Ewing sarcoma breakpoint region 1, U2AF2, and transcription elongation regulator 1.
