= RP9 =

Protein-coding gene in humans

Identifiers
- Aliases: RP9, PAP-1, PAP1, retinitis pigmentosa 9 (autosomal dominant), pre-mRNA splicing factor, RP9 pre-mRNA splicing factor
- External IDs: OMIM: 607331; MGI: 2157166; HomoloGene: 10290; GeneCards: RP9; OMA:RP9 - orthologs

Gene location (Human)
Chr.	Chromosome 7 (human)
Band	7p14.3	Start	33,094,797 bp
Band	7p14.3	End	33,109,405 bp

Gene location (Mouse)
Chr.	Chromosome 9 (mouse)
Band	9|9 A3	Start	22,322,343 bp
Band	9|9 A3	End	22,381,039 bp
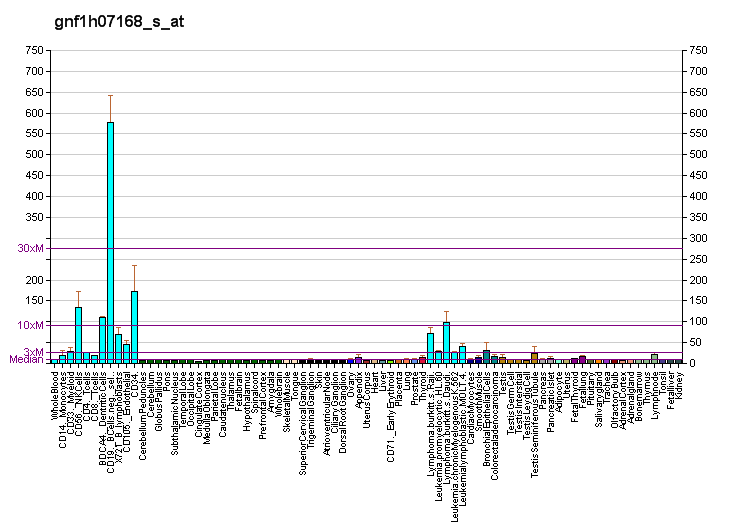
RNA expression pattern
Bgee	Human / Mouse (ortholog); Top expressed in: oocyte; myocardium of left ventricle; muscle of thigh; secondary oocyte; Skeletal muscle tissue of rectus abdominis; apex of heart; gastrocnemius muscle; body of tongue; pylorus; sural nerve / Top expressed in: lacrimal gland; Paneth cell; seminiferous tubule; parotid gland; motor neuron; vestibular membrane of cochlear duct; granulocyte; digastric muscle; yolk sac; migratory enteric neural crest cell; More reference expression data
BioGPS	More reference expression data
Gene ontology
Molecular function	protein binding; metal ion binding; RNA binding
Cellular component	signal recognition particle receptor complex; nucleus; cytosol
Biological process	cognition; RNA splicing
Sources:Amigo / QuickGO
Orthologs
Species	Human	Mouse
Entrez	6100	55934
Ensembl	ENSG00000164610	ENSMUSG00000032239
UniProt	Q8TA86	P97762
RefSeq (mRNA)	NM_203288	NM_018739
RefSeq (protein)	NP_976033	NP_061209
Location (UCSC)	Chr 7: 33.09 – 33.11 Mb	Chr 9: 22.32 – 22.38 Mb
PubMed search
- Wikidata
View/Edit Human	View/Edit Mouse

Retinitis pigmentosa 9 (autosomal dominant), also known as RP9 or PAP-1, is a protein which in humans is encoded by the RP9 gene.

== Function ==
The removal of introns from nuclear pre-mRNAs occurs on a complex called a spliceosome, which is made up of 4 small nuclear ribonucleoprotein (snRNP) particles and an undefined number of transiently associated splicing factors. The exact role of PAP-1 in splicing is not fully understood, but it is thought that PAP-1 localizes in nuclear speckles containing the splicing factor SRSF2 and interacts directly with another splicing factor, U2AF35.

== Clinical significance ==
Mutations in PAP1 underlie autosomal dominant retinitis pigmentosa mapped to the RP9 gene locus.

== Interactions ==
RP9 has been shown to interact with U2 small nuclear RNA auxiliary factor 1.
