= U2AF2 =

Protein-coding gene in humans

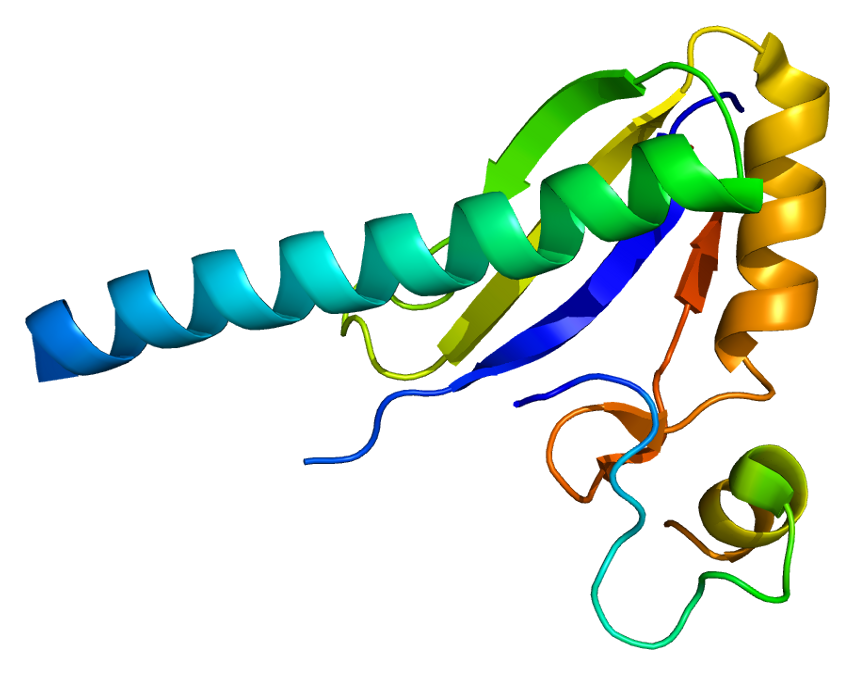

Identifiers
- Aliases: U2AF2, U2AF65, U2 small nuclear RNA auxiliary factor 2
- External IDs: OMIM: 191318; MGI: 98886; GeneCards: U2AF2
Available structures
PDB	Ortholog search: PDBe RCSB
PDB	List of PDB id codes 1JMT, 1O0P, 1OPI, 1U2F, 2G4B, 2HZC, 2M0G, 2U2F, 2YH0, 2YH1, 3VAF, 3VAG, 3VAH, 3VAI, 3VAJ, 3VAK, 3VAL, 3VAM, 4FXW, 4TU7, 4TU8, 4TU9, 5EV1, 5EV3, 5EV4, 5EV2

Gene location (Human)
Chr.	Chromosome 19 (human)
Band	19q13.42	Start	55,654,146 bp
Band	19q13.42	End	55,674,716 bp

Gene location (Mouse)
Chr.	Chromosome 7 (mouse)
Band	7|7 A1	Start	5,062,143 bp
Band	7|7 A1	End	5,079,938 bp
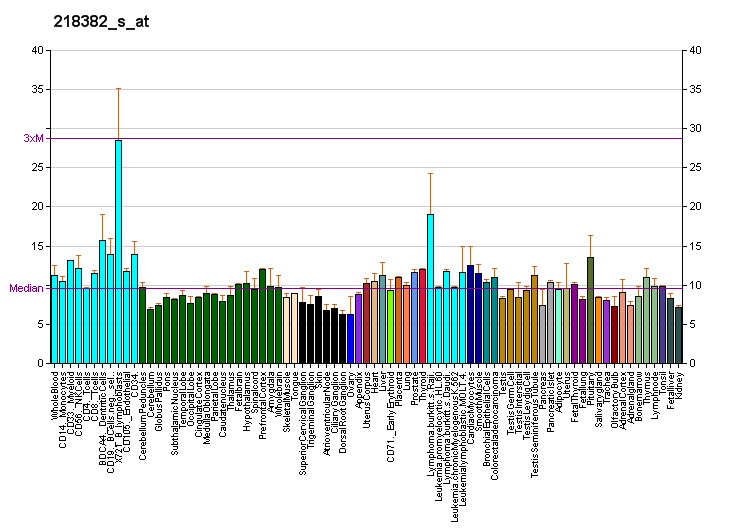

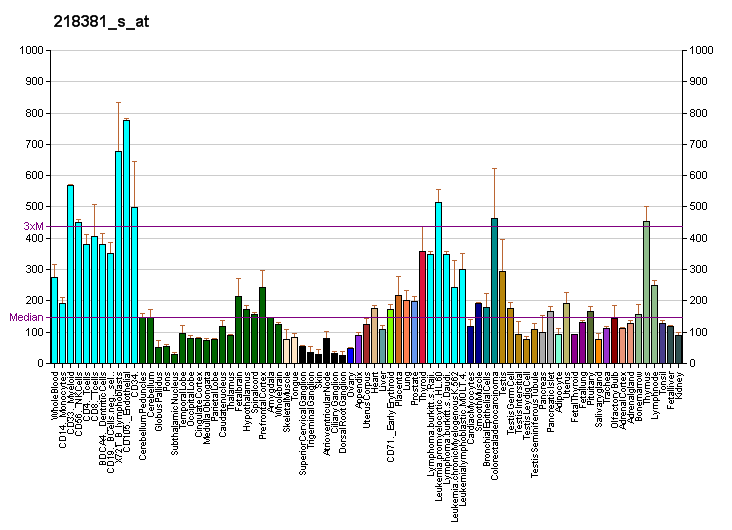
RNA expression pattern
Bgee	Human / Mouse (ortholog); Top expressed in: right uterine tube; canal of the cervix; granulocyte; anterior pituitary; right ovary; body of uterus; right lobe of thyroid gland; left ovary; left lobe of thyroid gland; right hemisphere of cerebellum / Top expressed in: ventricular zone; neural layer of retina; yolk sac; lip; epiblast; granulocyte; dentate gyrus of hippocampal formation granule cell; superior frontal gyrus; primary visual cortex; thymus; More reference expression data
BioGPS	More reference expression data
Gene ontology
Molecular function	pre-mRNA 3'-splice site binding; poly-pyrimidine tract binding; protein binding; nucleic acid binding; enzyme binding; C2H2 zinc finger domain binding; RNA binding
Cellular component	nuclear speck; U2AF complex; Prp19 complex; spliceosomal complex; commitment complex; U2-type prespliceosome; nucleus; nucleoplasm
Biological process	mRNA splicing, via spliceosome; termination of RNA polymerase II transcription; positive regulation of protein targeting to mitochondrion; mRNA processing; mRNA export from nucleus; negative regulation of mRNA splicing, via spliceosome; regulation of autophagy of mitochondrion; positive regulation of RNA splicing; mRNA 3'-end processing; RNA splicing; RNA export from nucleus; negative regulation of protein ubiquitination
Sources:Amigo / QuickGO
Orthologs
Databases	NCBI: entry; OMA: entry
Species	Human	Mouse
Entrez	11338	22185
Ensembl	ENSG00000063244	ENSMUSG00000030435
UniProt	P26368	P26369
RefSeq (mRNA)	NM_001012478; NM_007279	NM_001205231; NM_133671
RefSeq (protein)	NP_001012496; NP_009210	NP_001192160; NP_598432; NP_001390074; NP_001390075; NP_001390076 NP_001390077; NP_001390078; NP_001390079; NP_001390080; NP_001390083; NP_001390084; NP_001390085; NP_001390087; NP_001390088; NP_001390082
Location (UCSC)	Chr 19: 55.65 – 55.67 Mb	Chr 7: 5.06 – 5.08 Mb
PubMed search
- Wikidata
View/Edit Human	View/Edit Mouse

Splicing factor U2AF 65 kDa subunit is a protein that in humans is encoded by the U2AF2 gene.

== Function ==
In eukaryotes, the introns in the transcribed pre-mRNA first have to be removed by spliceosome in order to form a mature mRNA. A spliceosome is assembled from small nuclear ribonucleoproteins(snRNP) and small nuclear RNAs(snRNA). And the splicing factor can be divided into snRNP and non snRNP proteins.U2 auxiliary factor (U2AF), composed of a large and a small subunit, is a non-snRNP protein required for the binding of U2 snRNP to the pre-mRNA branch site. This gene encodes the U2AF large subunit, which contains a sequence-specific RNA-binding region with 3 RNA recognition motifs and an Arg/Ser-rich domain necessary for splicing. The large subunit binds to the polypyrimidine tract of introns early during spliceosome assembly. Multiple alternatively spliced transcript variants have been detected for this gene, but the full-length natures of only two have been determined to date.

In humans and other tetrapods, it has been shown that without U2AF2, the splicing process is inhibited. However, in zebrafish and other teleosts the RNA splicing process can still occur on certain genes in the absence of U2AF2. This may be because 10% of genes have alternating TG and AC base pairs at the 3' splice site (3'ss) and 5' splice site (5'ss) respectively on each intron, which alters the secondary structure of the RNA and influences splicing.

The splicing factor U2AF65 can specifically recognize the polypyrimidine tract (Py tract), that’s because U2AF65 consists of 3 RNA binding domains (RRMs), all of them have a high binding affinity to the Py tract on its adjacent 3’ splice site. The RRM1 and RRM2 are sufficient for specific RNA/protein binding, while RRM3 is responsible for protein/protein interactions. For example, the C-Terminal RRM3 contribute to establish protein–protein contacts with splicing factors like UAP56, SAP155, and mBBP/SF1.

== Interactions ==
U2AF2 has been shown to interact with:

- PUF60,
- SF1,
- SFRS11,
- SFRS2IP,
- SRPK2,
- U2 small nuclear RNA auxiliary factor 1 and
- WT1.
