= FF domain =

Domain found in FBP11, CA150, and PRP40
- Crystal structure of the TCERG1 FF4-6 tandem repeat domain

Identifiers
- Symbol: FF
- Pfam: PF01846
- InterPro: IPR002713
Available protein structures:
- Pfam: structures / ECOD
- PDB: RCSB PDB; PDBe; PDBj
- PDBsum: structure summary

FF domains are short protein domains of about 50 amino acids. The domain was discovered by multiple sequence alignments. FF domains have been found in various transcription factors, splicing proteins, and signaling proteins. FF domains and WW domains often occur together in proteins.

The structure of the FF domain in CA150 (TCERG1) was solved in 2009 with refinements in 2013.

FF domains are protein interaction domains and thus can mediate the interaction among different proteins, such as various splicing proteins in the spliceosome. For instance, the interaction of yeast splicing proteins Prp40 and Luc7 is mediated by FF domains.
