= PUF60 =

Protein-coding gene in the species Homo sapiens

Identifiers
- Aliases: PUF60, FIR, RoBPI, SIAHBP1, VRJS, poly(U) binding splicing factor 60KDa, poly(U) binding splicing factor 60
- External IDs: OMIM: 604819; MGI: 1915209; GeneCards: PUF60
Available structures
PDB	Ortholog search: PDBe RCSB
PDB	List of PDB id codes 2DNY, 2KXF, 2KXH, 2QFJ, 3DXB, 3UE2, 3US5, 3UWT

Gene location (Human)
Chr.	Chromosome 8 (human)
Band	8q24.3	Start	143,816,344 bp
Band	8q24.3	End	143,829,352 bp

Gene location (Mouse)
Chr.	Chromosome 15 (mouse)
Band	15|15 D3	Start	75,942,031 bp
Band	15|15 D3	End	75,952,773 bp
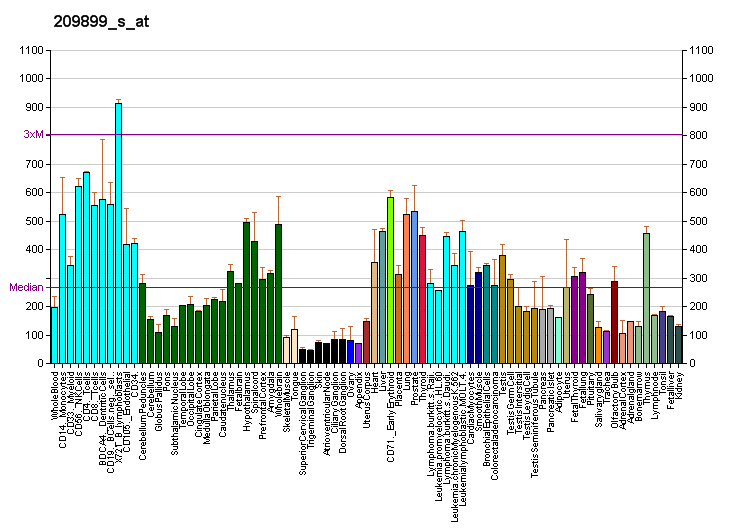

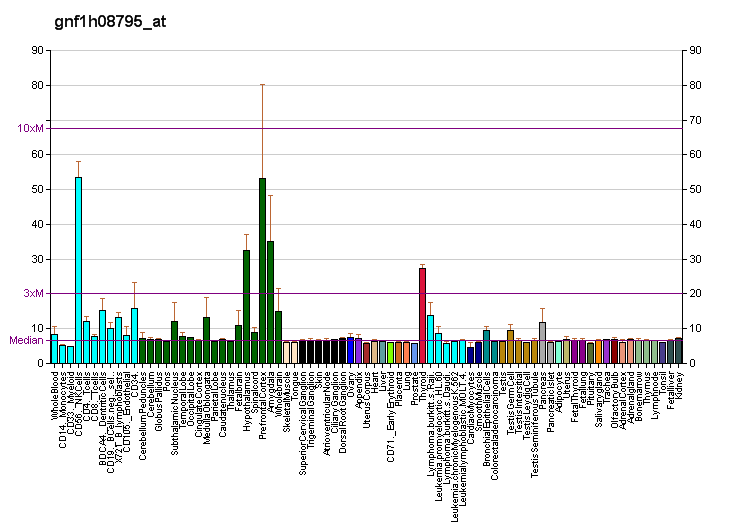
RNA expression pattern
Bgee	Human / Mouse (ortholog); Top expressed in: ventricular zone; right uterine tube; ganglionic eminence; tibial nerve; prefrontal cortex; substantia nigra; C1 segment; skin of leg; apex of heart; putamen / Top expressed in: mandibular prominence; maxillary prominence; somite; Gonadal ridge; neural layer of retina; vestibular sensory epithelium; supraoptic nucleus; ventricular zone; internal carotid artery; external carotid artery; More reference expression data
BioGPS	More reference expression data
Gene ontology
Molecular function	nucleic acid binding; DNA binding; protein binding; identical protein binding; RNA binding; cadherin binding
Cellular component	cell junction; cyclin-dependent protein kinase activating kinase holoenzyme complex; nucleus; nucleoplasm
Biological process	mRNA processing; regulation of transcription, DNA-templated; transcription, DNA-templated; RNA splicing; apoptotic process; mRNA splicing, via spliceosome
Sources:Amigo / QuickGO
Orthologs
Databases	NCBI: entry; OMA: entry
Species	Human	Mouse
Entrez	22827	67959
Ensembl	ENSG00000179950; ENSG00000274081	ENSMUSG00000002524
UniProt	Q9UHX1	Q3UEB3
RefSeq (mRNA)	NM_001136033; NM_001271096; NM_001271097; NM_001271098; NM_001271099 NM_001271100; NM_014281; NM_078480; NM_001362895; NM_001362896; NM_001362897	NM_001164600; NM_028364; NM_133691; NM_001356629; NM_001378984 NM_001378985; NM_001378986
RefSeq (protein)	NP_001129505; NP_001258025; NP_001258026; NP_001258027; NP_001258028 NP_001258029; NP_055096; NP_510965; NP_001349824; NP_001349825; NP_001349826	NP_001158072; NP_082640; NP_598452; NP_001343558; NP_001365913 NP_001365914; NP_001365915; NP_001389972; NP_001389973; NP_001389974; NP_001389975
Location (UCSC)	Chr 8: 143.82 – 143.83 Mb	Chr 15: 75.94 – 75.95 Mb
PubMed search
- Wikidata
View/Edit Human	View/Edit Mouse

Poly(U)-binding-splicing factor PUF60 is a protein that in humans is encoded by the PUF60 gene.

The protein encoded by this gene is a Ro RNP-binding protein. It interacts with Ro RNPs and their interaction is thought to represent a gain of function for Ro RNPs. This protein also forms a ternary complex with far upstream element (FUSE) and FUSE-binding protein. It can repress a c-myc reporter via the FUSE. It is also known to target transcription factor IIH and inhibit activated transcription. This gene is implicated in the xeroderma pigmentosum disorder. There are two alternatively spliced transcript variants of this gene encoding different isoforms. There seems to be evidence of multiple polyadenylation sites for this gene.

Mutations in the PUF60 gene may cause Verheij syndrome, which was first described in 2009 and manifests with growth retardation, delayed psychomotor development, dysmorphic facial features, and skeletal, mainly vertebral, abnormalities.

== Interactions ==
PUF60 has been shown to interact with U2AF2.
