= ZRANB2 =

Protein-coding gene in humans

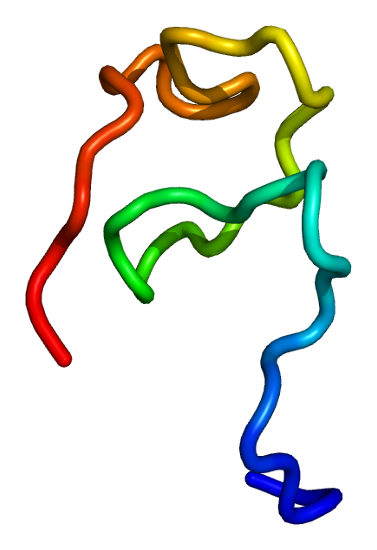

Identifiers
- Aliases: ZRANB2, ZIS, ZIS1, ZIS2, ZNF265, zinc finger RANBP2-type containing 2
- External IDs: OMIM: 604347; MGI: 1858211; GeneCards: ZRANB2
Available structures
PDB	Ortholog search: PDBe RCSB
PDB	List of PDB id codes 1N0Z, 2K1P, 3G9Y

Gene location (Human)
Chr.	Chromosome 1 (human)
Band	1p31.1	Start	71,063,291 bp
Band	1p31.1	End	71,081,289 bp

Gene location (Mouse)
Chr.	Chromosome 3 (mouse)
Band	3|3 H4	Start	157,239,797 bp
Band	3|3 H4	End	157,254,047 bp
RNA expression pattern
Bgee	Human / Mouse (ortholog); Top expressed in: pancreatic epithelial cell; mucosa of ileum; Achilles tendon; cardiac muscle tissue of right atrium; corpus epididymis; caput epididymis; tibialis anterior muscle; anterior pituitary; tibia; myocardium of left ventricle / Top expressed in: genital tubercle; tail of embryo; medullary collecting duct; neural layer of retina; renal corpuscle; cerebellar cortex; atrioventricular valve; olfactory bulb; vestibular membrane of cochlear duct; primitive streak; More reference expression data
BioGPS	n/a
Gene ontology
Molecular function	DNA-binding transcription factor activity; protein binding; metal ion binding; RNA binding; lipopolysaccharide binding
Cellular component	nucleus; nucleoplasm
Biological process	mRNA processing; RNA splicing; regulation of transcription, DNA-templated
Sources:Amigo / QuickGO
Orthologs
Databases	NCBI: entry; OMA: entry
Species	Human	Mouse
Entrez	9406	53861
Ensembl	ENSG00000132485	ENSMUSG00000028180
UniProt	O95218	Q9R020
RefSeq (mRNA)	NM_005455; NM_203350	NM_017381; NM_001355381; NM_001355386
RefSeq (protein)	NP_005446; NP_976225	NP_059077; NP_001342310; NP_001342315
Location (UCSC)	Chr 1: 71.06 – 71.08 Mb	Chr 3: 157.24 – 157.25 Mb
PubMed search
- Wikidata
View/Edit Human	View/Edit Mouse

Zinc finger Ran-binding domain-containing protein 2 is a protein that in humans is encoded by the ZRANB2 gene.

== Interactions ==
ZRANB2 has been shown to interact with U2 small nuclear RNA auxiliary factor 1 and SNRP70.
