= SFRS11 =

Protein-coding gene in humans

SRSF11

Identifiers
- Aliases: SRSF11, NET2, SFRS11, dJ677H15.2, p54, serine/arginine-rich splicing factor 11, serine and arginine rich splicing factor 11
- External IDs: OMIM: 602010; MGI: 1916457; GeneCards: SRSF11

Gene location (Human)
| Chr. | Chromosome 1 (human) |
| Band | 1p31.1 | Start | 70,205,682 bp |
| Band | 1p31.1 | End | 70,253,052 bp |

Gene location (Mouse)
| Chr. | Chromosome 3 (mouse) |
| Band | 3|3 H4 | Start | 158,010,473 bp |
| Band | 3|3 H4 | End | 158,036,639 bp |
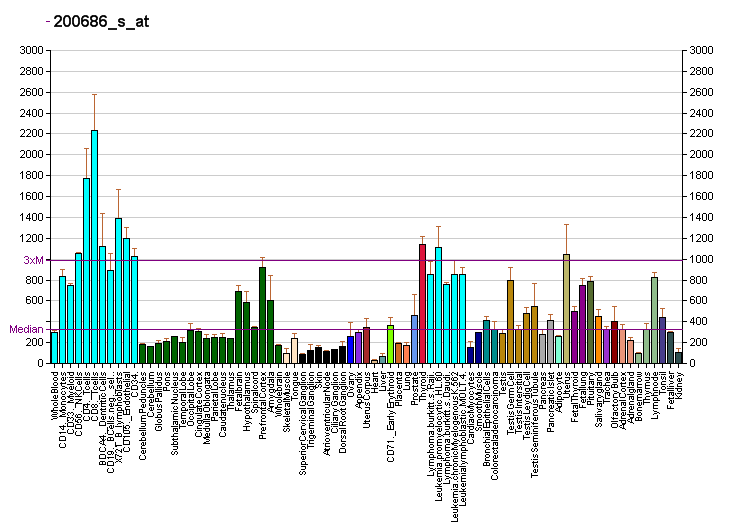

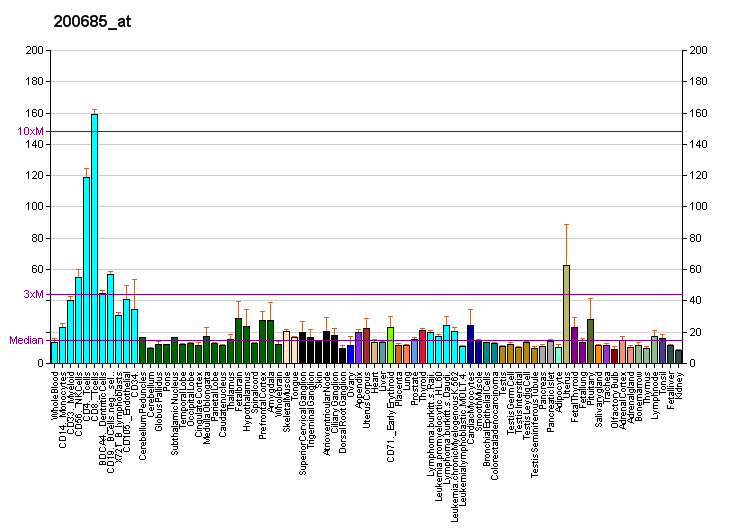
RNA expression pattern
| Bgee | Human / Mouse (ortholog); Top expressed in: visceral pleura; parietal pleura; tibia; mucosa of paranasal sinus; gastric mucosa; Achilles tendon; endothelial cell; skin of hip; sural nerve; germinal epithelium / Top expressed in: neural layer of retina; tail of embryo; genital tubercle; abdominal wall; cerebellar cortex; saccule; primitive streak; dermis; vas deferens; superior frontal gyrus; More reference expression data |
| BioGPS | More reference expression data |
Gene ontology
| Molecular function | protein binding; nucleic acid binding; RNA binding |
| Cellular component | nucleus; nucleoplasm; nuclear speck |
| Biological process | mRNA splicing, via spliceosome; termination of RNA polymerase II transcription; mRNA processing; mRNA 3'-end processing; mRNA export from nucleus; RNA splicing; RNA export from nucleus |
Sources:Amigo / QuickGO
Orthologs
| Databases | NCBI: entry; OMA: entry |
| Species | Human | Mouse |
| Entrez | 9295 | 69207 |
| Ensembl | ENSG00000116754 | ENSMUSG00000055436 |
| UniProt | Q05519; Q5T757 | n/a |
| RefSeq (mRNA) | NM_001190987; NM_004768; NM_001350605; NM_001350606; NM_001350607 NM_001350608; NM_001350609; NM_001350610; NM_001350611; NM_001350612; NM_001350613; NM_001350614; NM_001350615; NM_001350616; NM_001394402; NM_001394403; NM_001394404; NM_001394405; NM_001394406; NM_001394407; NM_001394408 | NM_001093752; NM_001093753; NM_026989; NM_001356997 |
| RefSeq (protein) | NP_001177916; NP_004759; NP_001337534; NP_001337535; NP_001337536 NP_001337537; NP_001337538; NP_001337539; NP_001337540; NP_001337541; NP_001337542; NP_001337543; NP_001337544; NP_001337545 | n/a |
| Location (UCSC) | Chr 1: 70.21 – 70.25 Mb | Chr 3: 158.01 – 158.04 Mb |
| PubMed search |
- Wikidata
| View/Edit Human | View/Edit Mouse |

Splicing factor, arginine/serine-rich 11 is a protein that in humans is encoded by the SFRS11 gene.

This gene encodes 54-kD nuclear protein that contains an arginine/serine-rich region similar to segments found in pre-mRNA splicing factors. Although the function of this protein is not yet known, structure and immunolocalization data suggest that it may play a role in pre-mRNA processing.

== Interactions ==
SFRS11 has been shown to interact with U2AF2.
