= SRPK2 =

Protein-coding gene in the species Homo sapiens

Identifiers
- Aliases: SRPK2, SFRSK2, SRSF protein kinase 2
- External IDs: OMIM: 602980; MGI: 1201408; GeneCards: SRPK2
Available structures
PDB	Ortholog search: PDBe RCSB
PDB	List of PDB id codes 2X7G
Enzyme activity
EC #	BRENDA	ExPASy	KEGG	MetaCyc
2.7.11.1	↗	↗	↗	↗

Gene location (Human)
Chr.	Chromosome 7 (human)
Band	7q22.3	Start	105,110,704 bp
Band	7q22.3	End	105,399,308 bp

Gene location (Mouse)
Chr.	Chromosome 5 (mouse)
Band	5 A3|5 10.36 cM	Start	23,503,264 bp
Band	5 A3|5 10.36 cM	End	23,684,617 bp
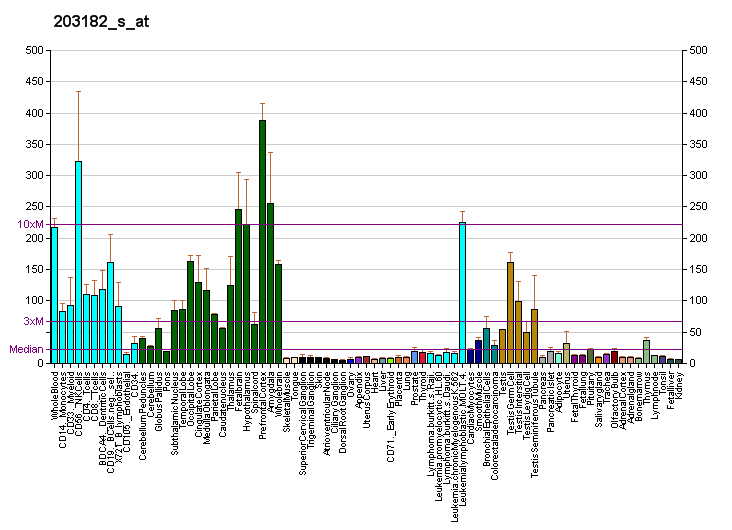

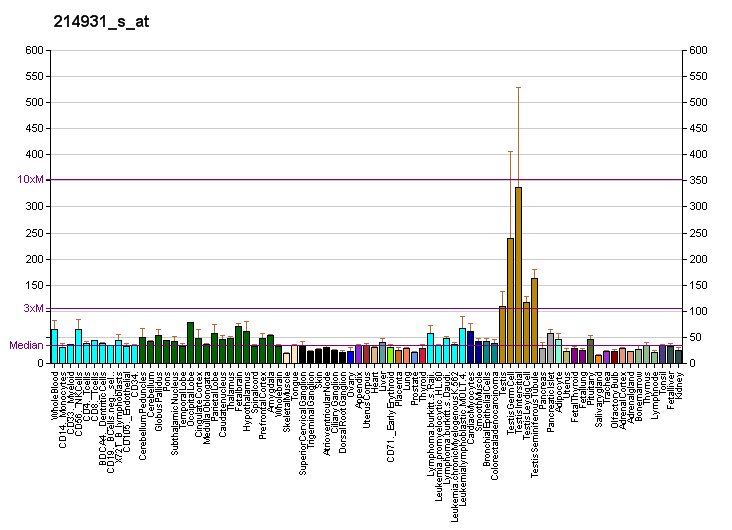

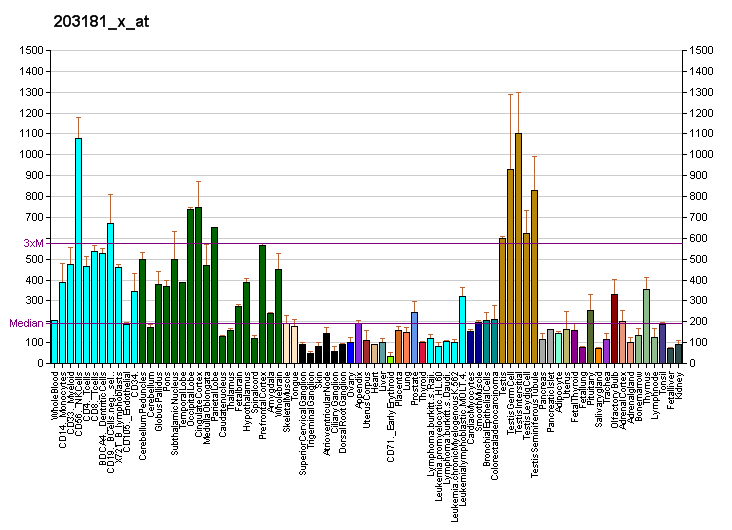
RNA expression pattern
Bgee	Human / Mouse (ortholog); Top expressed in: sperm; pons; secondary oocyte; middle temporal gyrus; lateral nuclear group of thalamus; entorhinal cortex; parietal lobe; postcentral gyrus; left testis; right testis / Top expressed in: Rostral migratory stream; medial dorsal nucleus; medial geniculate nucleus; ventral tegmental area; spermatid; lateral geniculate nucleus; seminiferous tubule; pontine nuclei; medial vestibular nucleus; globus pallidus; More reference expression data
BioGPS	More reference expression data
Gene ontology
Molecular function	transferase activity; nucleotide binding; protein kinase activity; 14-3-3 protein binding; kinase activity; protein serine/threonine kinase activity; protein binding; ATP binding; magnesium ion binding; RNA binding
Cellular component	cytoplasm; nucleoplasm; nucleolus; nucleus; cytosol
Biological process	cell differentiation; intracellular signal transduction; nuclear speck organization; phosphorylation; mRNA processing; regulation of mRNA splicing, via spliceosome; protein phosphorylation; spliceosomal complex assembly; positive regulation of neuron apoptotic process; negative regulation of viral genome replication; positive regulation of gene expression; positive regulation of cell cycle; angiogenesis; RNA splicing; positive regulation of cell population proliferation; positive regulation of viral genome replication; innate immune response; regulation of gene expression; regulation of mRNA processing
Sources:Amigo / QuickGO
Orthologs
Databases	NCBI: entry; OMA: entry
Species	Human	Mouse
Entrez	6733	20817
Ensembl	ENSG00000135250	ENSMUSG00000062604
UniProt	P78362	O54781
RefSeq (mRNA)	NM_001278273; NM_182691; NM_182692; NM_001350738; NM_001350739 NM_001350740; NM_001350741; NM_001350742; NM_001350743; NM_001350744; NM_001350745; NM_001350746	NM_009274; NM_001359172; NM_001359173; NM_001359174; NM_001359175 NM_001359176
RefSeq (protein)	NP_001265202; NP_872633; NP_872634; NP_001337667; NP_001337668 NP_001337669; NP_001337670; NP_001337671; NP_001337672; NP_001337673; NP_001337674; NP_001337675	NP_033300; NP_001346101; NP_001346102; NP_001346103; NP_001346104 NP_001346105; NP_001394425; NP_001394427; NP_001394428; NP_001394429; NP_001394430; NP_001394431; NP_001394432; NP_001394433; NP_001394434; NP_001394435; NP_001394436; NP_001394437; NP_001394438; NP_001394439; NP_001394440; NP_001394441; NP_001394442; NP_001394443; NP_001394444; NP_001394445; NP_001394446; NP_001394447; NP_001394448; NP_001394449; NP_001394450; NP_001394451; NP_001394452
Location (UCSC)	Chr 7: 105.11 – 105.4 Mb	Chr 5: 23.5 – 23.68 Mb
PubMed search
- Wikidata
View/Edit Human	View/Edit Mouse

Serine/threonine-protein kinase SRPK2 is an enzyme that in humans is encoded by the SRPK2 gene.

== Interactions ==
SRPK2 has been shown to interact with:

- ASF/SF2 and
- U2AF2.
