= CLK1 =

Protein-coding gene in humans

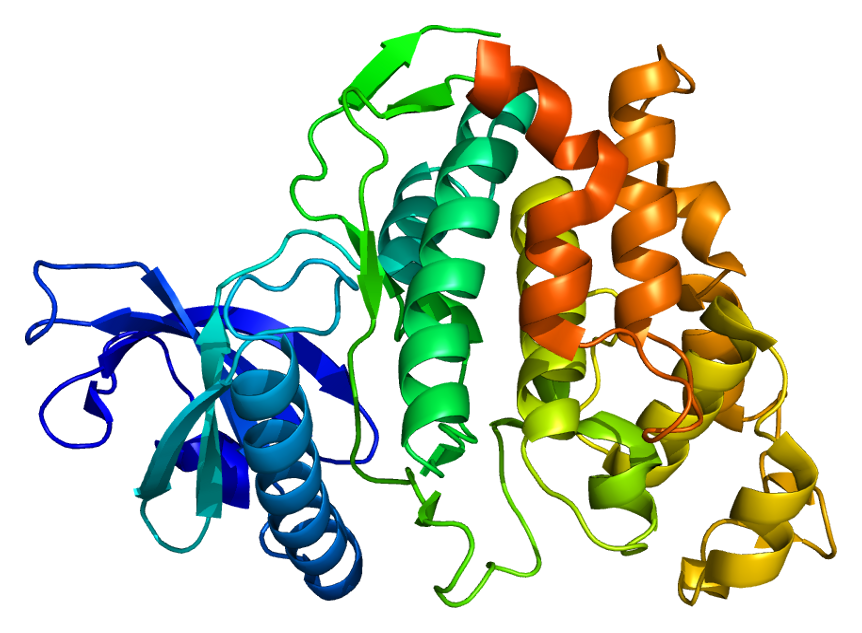

Identifiers
- Aliases: CLK1, CLK, CLK/STY, STY, CDC like kinase 1
- External IDs: OMIM: 601951; MGI: 107403; GeneCards: CLK1
Available structures
PDB	Ortholog search: PDBe RCSB
PDB	List of PDB id codes 1Z57, 2VAG, 5J1V, 5J1W
Enzyme activity
EC #	BRENDA	ExPASy	KEGG	MetaCyc
2.7.12.1	↗	↗	↗	↗

Gene location (Human)
Chr.	Chromosome 2 (human)
Band	2q33.1	Start	200,853,009 bp
Band	2q33.1	End	200,864,691 bp

Gene location (Mouse)
Chr.	Chromosome 1 (mouse)
Band	1 C1.3|1 29.09 cM	Start	58,449,348 bp
Band	1 C1.3|1 29.09 cM	End	58,463,225 bp
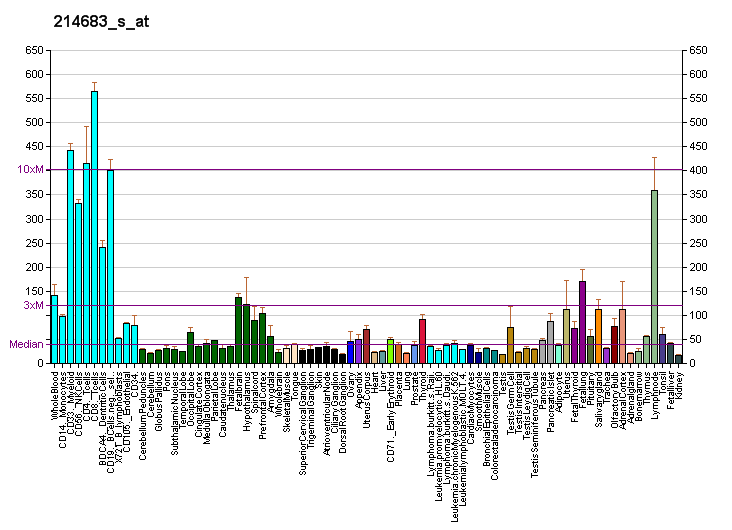
RNA expression pattern
Bgee	Human / Mouse (ortholog); Top expressed in: granulocyte; right uterine tube; right ovary; left ovary; tibial nerve; anterior pituitary; C1 segment; left lobe of thyroid gland; canal of the cervix; gastric mucosa / Top expressed in: granulocyte; neural layer of retina; pineal gland; spleen; lymph node; left lung lobe; superior cervical ganglion; blood; tunica media of zone of aorta; skin of external ear; More reference expression data
BioGPS	More reference expression data
Gene ontology
Molecular function	transferase activity; nucleotide binding; protein serine/threonine/tyrosine kinase activity; protein serine/threonine kinase activity; protein kinase activity; protein tyrosine kinase activity; non-membrane spanning protein tyrosine kinase activity; protein binding; ATP binding; kinase activity
Cellular component	cytoplasm; nucleus
Biological process	protein autophosphorylation; peptidyl-tyrosine phosphorylation; regulation of RNA splicing; protein phosphorylation; cell population proliferation; peptidyl-threonine phosphorylation; peptidyl-serine phosphorylation; phosphorylation
Sources:Amigo / QuickGO
Orthologs
Databases	NCBI: entry; OMA: entry
Species	Human	Mouse
Entrez	1195	12747
Ensembl	ENSG00000013441	ENSMUSG00000026034
UniProt	P49759	P22518
RefSeq (mRNA)	NM_001024646; NM_001162407; NM_004071	NM_001042634; NM_009905
RefSeq (protein)	NP_001155879; NP_004062	NP_001036099
Location (UCSC)	Chr 2: 200.85 – 200.86 Mb	Chr 1: 58.45 – 58.46 Mb
PubMed search
- Wikidata
View/Edit Human	View/Edit Mouse

Dual specificity protein kinase CLK1 is an enzyme that in humans is encoded by the CLK1 gene.

== Function ==
This gene encodes a member of the CDC2-like (or LAMMER) family of dual specificity protein kinases. In the cell nucleus, the encoded protein phosphorylates serine/arginine-rich proteins involved in pre-mRNA processing, releasing them into the nucleoplasm. The choice of splice sites during pre-mRNA processing may be regulated by the concentration of transacting factors, including serine/arginine-rich proteins. Therefore, the encoded protein may play an indirect role in governing splice site selection.

== Interactions ==
CLK1 has been shown to interact with ASF/SF2.
