= Transcription elongation regulator 1 =

Protein-coding gene in the species Homo sapiens

TCERG1
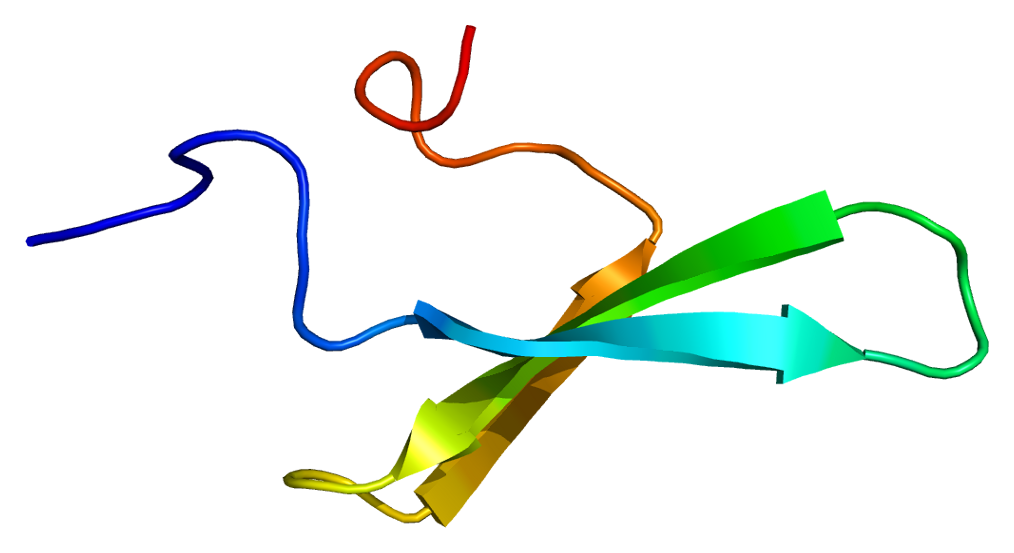
Available structures
PDB	Ortholog search: PDBe RCSB
PDB	List of PDB id codes 2DK7, 2DOD, 2DOE, 2DOF, 2E71, 2KIQ, 2KIS, 2MW9, 2MWA, 2MWB, 2MWD, 2MWF, 2NNT, 3HFH, 3Q1I, 4FQG, 2N4R, 2N4S, 2N4T, 2N4U, 2N4V, 2N4W

Identifiers
- Aliases: TCERG1, CA150, TAF2S, Urn1, transcription elongation regulator 1
- External IDs: OMIM: 605409; MGI: 1926421; HomoloGene: 4879; GeneCards: TCERG1; OMA:TCERG1 - orthologs

Gene location (Human)
Chr.	Chromosome 5 (human)
Band	5q32	Start	146,447,311 bp
Band	5q32	End	146,511,961 bp

Gene location (Mouse)
Chr.	Chromosome 18 (mouse)
Band	18|18 B3	Start	42,644,552 bp
Band	18|18 B3	End	42,708,858 bp
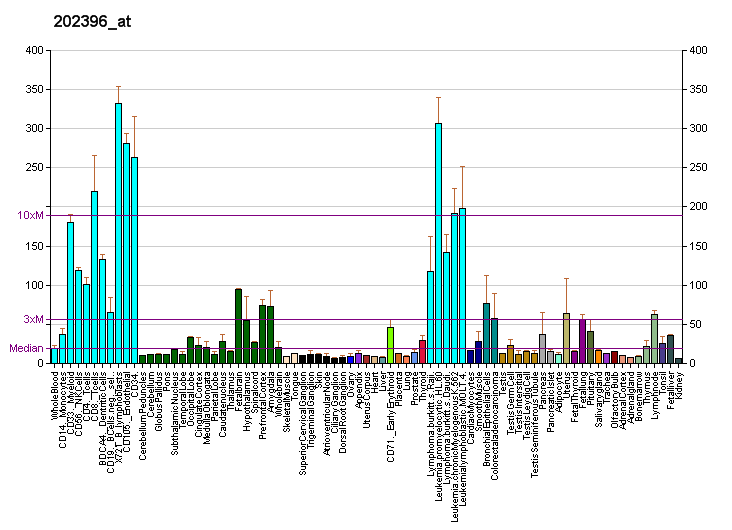
RNA expression pattern
Bgee	Human / Mouse (ortholog); Top expressed in: right hemisphere of cerebellum; right uterine tube; sural nerve; ventricular zone; Achilles tendon; ganglionic eminence; left ovary; right ovary; anterior pituitary; skin of abdomen / Top expressed in: tail of embryo; genital tubercle; zygote; ventricular zone; neural layer of retina; yolk sac; secondary oocyte; embryo; embryo; dentate gyrus of hippocampal formation granule cell; More reference expression data
BioGPS	More reference expression data
Gene ontology
Molecular function	transcription coactivator activity; transcription corepressor activity; proline-rich region binding; protein binding; RNA binding; identical protein binding; RNA polymerase binding
Cellular component	nucleus; nucleoplasm
Biological process	regulation of transcription, DNA-templated; negative regulation of transcription by RNA polymerase II; transcription by RNA polymerase II; transcription, DNA-templated; positive regulation of nucleic acid-templated transcription
Sources:Amigo / QuickGO
Orthologs
Species	Human	Mouse
Entrez	10915	56070
Ensembl	ENSG00000113649	ENSMUSG00000024498
UniProt	O14776	Q8CGF7
RefSeq (mRNA)	NM_001040006; NM_006706; NM_001382548	NM_001039474; NM_001289526; NM_001360881; NM_019512
RefSeq (protein)	NP_001035095; NP_006697; NP_001369477	NP_001034563; NP_001276455; NP_001347810
Location (UCSC)	Chr 5: 146.45 – 146.51 Mb	Chr 18: 42.64 – 42.71 Mb
PubMed search
- Wikidata
View/Edit Human	View/Edit Mouse

Transcription elongation regulator 1, also known as TCERG1, is a protein which in humans is encoded by the TCERG1 gene.

== Function ==
This gene encodes a nuclear protein that regulates transcriptional elongation and pre-mRNA splicing. The encoded protein interacts with the hyperphosphorylated C-terminal domain of RNA polymerase II via multiple FF domains, and with the pre-mRNA splicing factor SF1 via a WW domain. Alternative splicing results in multiple transcripts variants encoding different isoforms.

== Interactions ==
Transcription elongation regulator 1 has been shown to interact with SF1 and POLR2A.
