= SCAF11 =

Protein-coding gene in humans

Identifiers
- Aliases: SCAF11, CASP11, SFRS2IP, SIP1, SRRP129, SRSF2IP, SR-related CTD associated factor 11
- External IDs: OMIM: 603668; MGI: 1919443; GeneCards: SCAF11

Gene location (Human)
Chr.	Chromosome 12 (human)
Band	12q12	Start	45,919,131 bp
Band	12q12	End	45,992,120 bp

Gene location (Mouse)
Chr.	Chromosome 15 (mouse)
Band	15|15 F1	Start	96,309,580 bp
Band	15|15 F1	End	96,358,724 bp
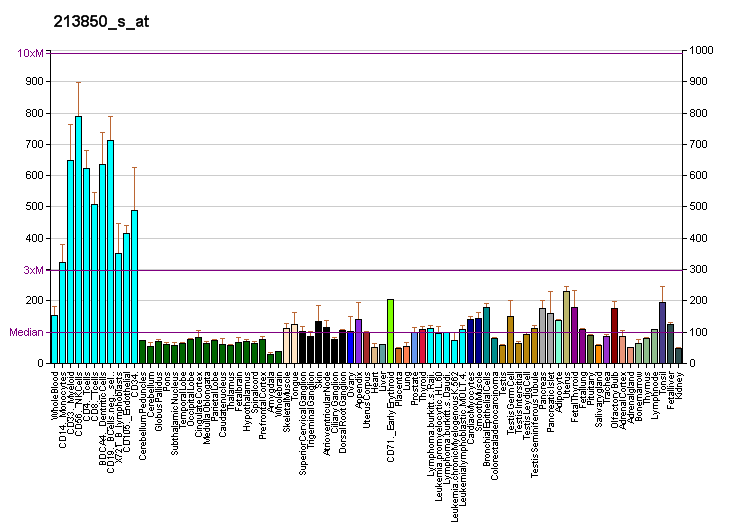

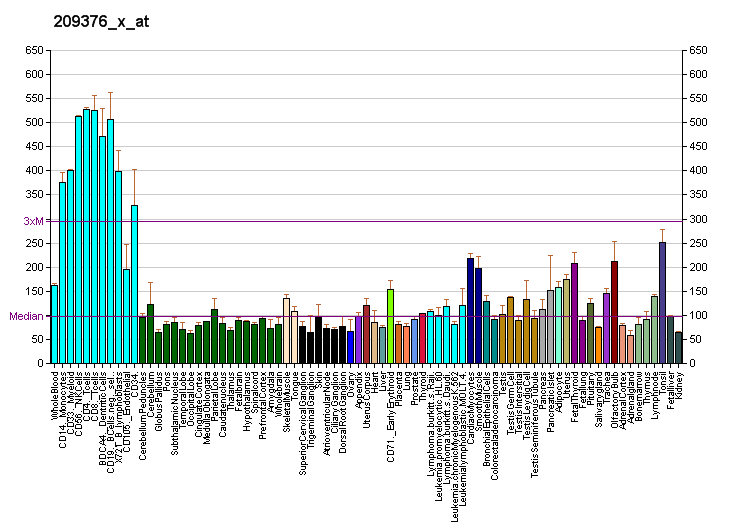

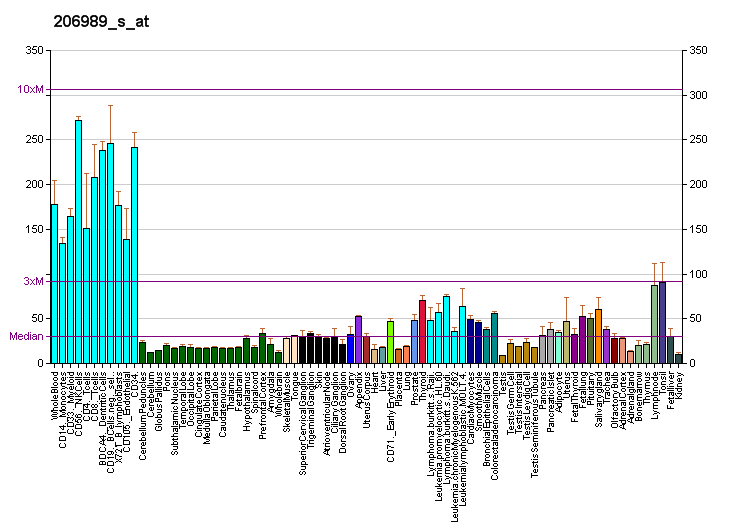
RNA expression pattern
Bgee	Human / Mouse (ortholog); Top expressed in: buccal mucosa cell; epithelium of colon; tendon of biceps brachii; Achilles tendon; lower lobe of lung; jejunal mucosa; pylorus; tonsil; oral cavity; sural nerve / Top expressed in: tail of embryo; genital tubercle; mandibular prominence; maxillary prominence; epithelium of stomach; ankle; skin of external ear; abdominal wall; tibiofemoral joint; cumulus cell; More reference expression data
BioGPS	More reference expression data
Gene ontology
Molecular function	protein binding; metal ion binding; RNA binding
Cellular component	nucleolus; nucleus; nucleoplasm; nuclear body
Biological process	RNA splicing, via transesterification reactions; mRNA processing; spliceosomal complex assembly; RNA splicing
Sources:Amigo / QuickGO
Orthologs
Databases	NCBI: entry; OMA: entry
Species	Human	Mouse
Entrez	9169	72193
Ensembl	ENSG00000139218	ENSMUSG00000033228
UniProt	Q99590	n/a
RefSeq (mRNA)	NM_004719	NM_028148
RefSeq (protein)	NP_004710	n/a
Location (UCSC)	Chr 12: 45.92 – 45.99 Mb	Chr 15: 96.31 – 96.36 Mb
PubMed search
- Wikidata
View/Edit Human	View/Edit Mouse

SR-related CTD associated factor 11 is a protein that in humans is encoded by the SCAF11 gene (previously SFRS2IP). This protein is involved in regulating the assembly of the spliceosome.

== Interactions ==
SCAF11 has been shown to interact with U2AF2.
