= TEX56P =

Pseudogene found in humans

Identifiers
- Aliases: TEX56P, dJ1013A10.5, chromosome 6 open reading frame 201, protein MGC87625, C6orf201, Testis expressed 56, pseudogene
- External IDs: MGI: 1914011; GeneCards: TEX56P

Gene location (Human)
Chr.	Chromosome 6 (human)
Band	6p25.2	Start	4,079,209 bp
Band	6p25.2	End	4,130,951 bp

Gene location (Mouse)
Chr.	Chromosome 13 (mouse)
Band	13|13 A3.3	Start	35,108,392 bp
Band	13|13 A3.3	End	35,139,858 bp
RNA expression pattern
Bgee	Human / Mouse (ortholog); Top expressed in: testicle; body of pancreas; fundus; Achilles tendon / Top expressed in: seminiferous tubule; spermatid; spermatocyte; right kidney; proximal tubule; human kidney; duodenum; jejunum; islet of Langerhans; More reference expression data
BioGPS	n/a
Orthologs
Databases	NCBI: entry; OMA: entry
Species	Human	Mouse
Entrez	404220	66761
Ensembl	ENSG00000185689	ENSMUSG00000021415
UniProt	Q7Z4U5	Q497N7
RefSeq (mRNA)	NM_001085401; NM_206834	NM_025750
RefSeq (protein)	NP_001078870	NP_080026
Location (UCSC)	Chr 6: 4.08 – 4.13 Mb	Chr 13: 35.11 – 35.14 Mb
PubMed search
- Wikidata
View/Edit Human	View/Edit Mouse

TEX56P (testis expressed 56, pseudogene), previously called C6orf201, is a non-coding pseudogene found in humans. In humans this gene encodes for a nuclear protein that is primarily expressed in the testis.

== Gene ==
In humans, the gene is 51,558 base pairs long. The transcript that produces the longest protein of 140 amino acids is translated from unprocessed mRNA that has six exons and is 1664 nucleotides in length.

=== Aliases ===
Chromosome 6 open reading frame 201 (C6orf201) is also referred to as: dJ1013A10.5, MGC87625, RP5-1013A10.5, and LOC404220.

=== Locus ===
C6orf201 is located on chromosome 6 at 6p25.2 position and is encoded on the plus strand. C6orf201 is located near the FAM217A gene and the ECI2 gene.

== Conservation ==
C6orf201 is highly conserved in primates, is moderately conserved in other mammals, and there is also conservation in a few reptiles. There is enough conservation in mycoplasma gallinarum to suggest that there may have been a horizontal gene transfer event sometime during the evolutionary history of C6orf201. There are no paralogs or gene duplication events for C6orf201.

=== Orthologs ===
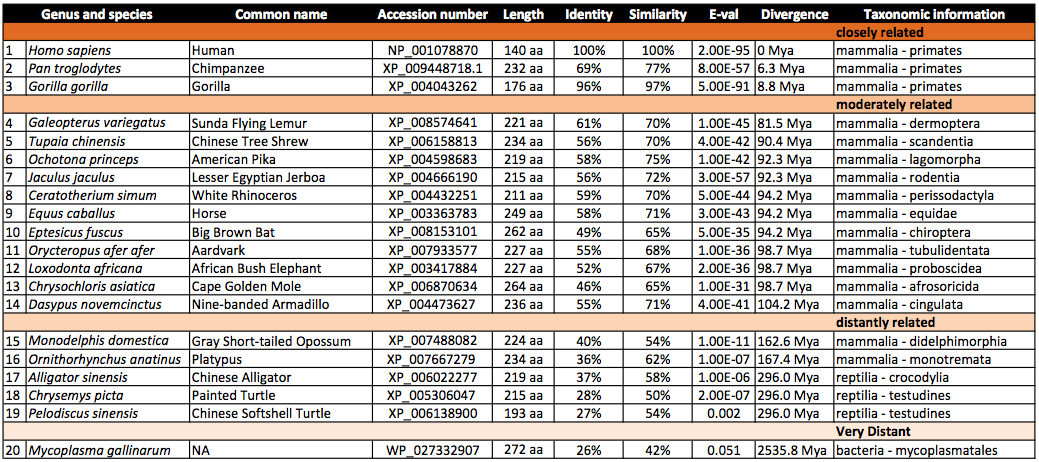

=== Homologous domains ===
C6orf201 belongs to DUF4523 (Pfam15023), a functionally uncharacterized family of proteins that is found in mammals.

== Expression ==
C6orf201 is primarily expressed in the testis of humans and is also expressed in the testis of adult mice and rats. GEO microarray data also supports expression of C6orf201 in the testis of humans and mouse.

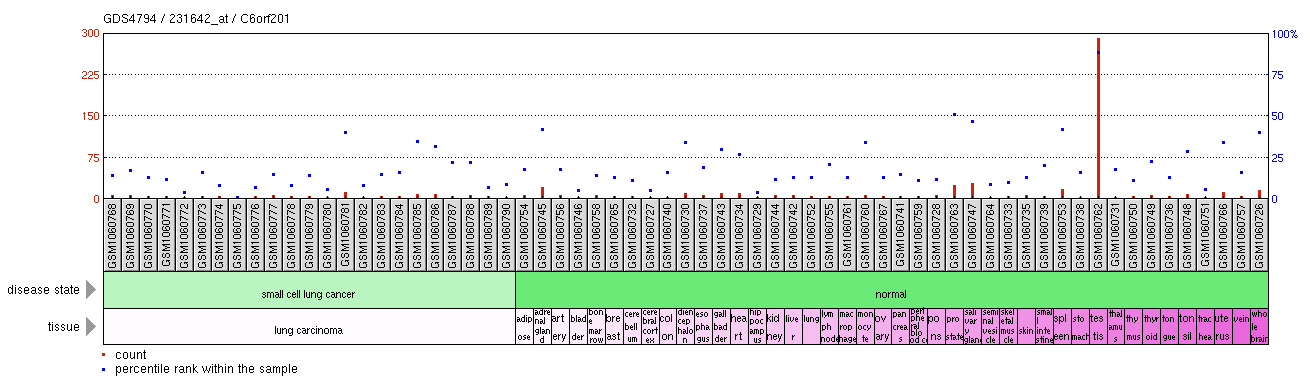
Expression of C6orf201 in various human tissues showing highest expression in the testis.

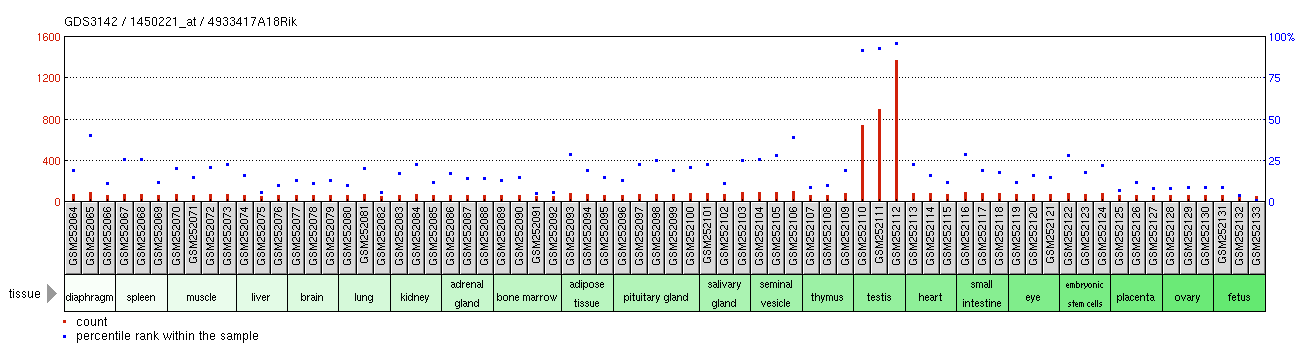
Expression of C6orf201 in various mouse tissues showing highest expression in the testis.
