= U2 small nuclear RNA auxiliary factor 1 =

Protein-coding gene in the species Homo sapiens

U2AF1
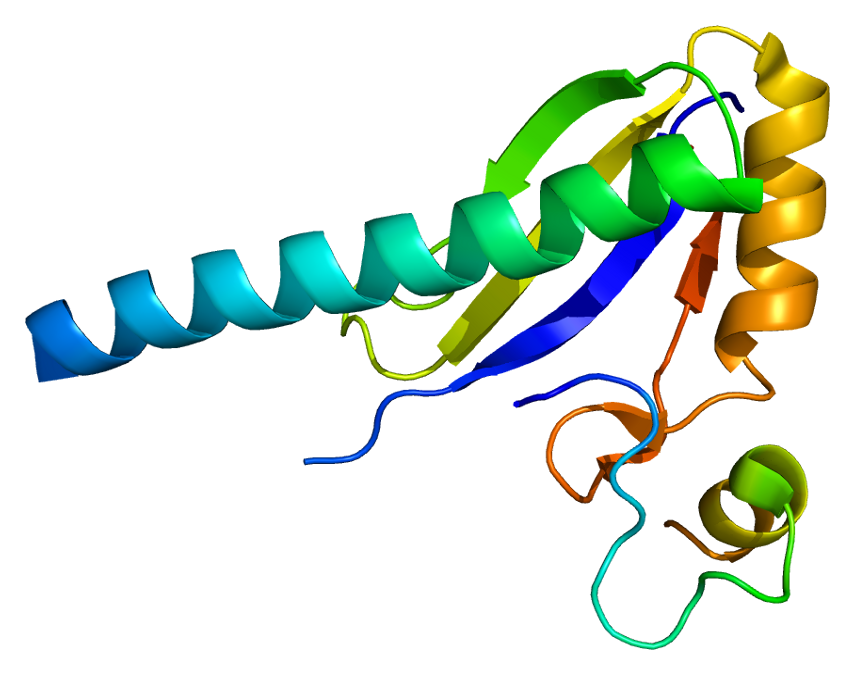

Identifiers
- Aliases: U2AF1, FP793, RN, RNU2AF35, U2AFBP, U2 small nuclear RNA auxiliary factor 1
- External IDs: OMIM: 191317; GeneCards: U2AF1
Available structures
PDB	Human UniProt search: PDBe RCSB
PDB	List of PDB id codes 1JMT

Gene location (Human)
Chr.	Chromosome 21 (human)
Band	21q22.3	Start	43,092,956 bp
Band	21q22.3	End	43,107,570 bp
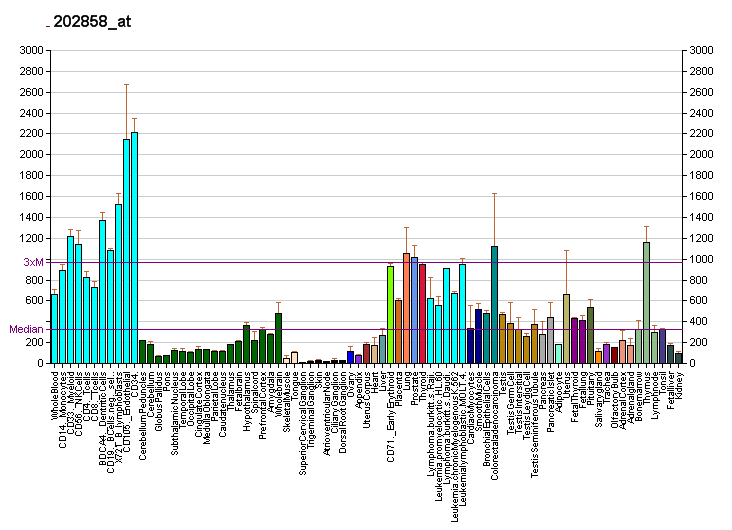
RNA expression pattern
Bgee	Human / Mouse (ortholog); Top expressed in: anterior pituitary; left uterine tube; bone marrow; olfactory zone of nasal mucosa; mucosa of transverse colon; appendix; stromal cell of endometrium; right lung; monocyte; granulocyte / n/a; More reference expression data
BioGPS	More reference expression data
Gene ontology
Molecular function	metal ion binding; protein binding; nucleic acid binding; pre-mRNA 3'-splice site binding; RNA binding; RS domain binding
Cellular component	Cajal body; nuclear speck; catalytic step 2 spliceosome; U2AF complex; nucleoplasm; spliceosomal complex; nucleus
Biological process	termination of RNA polymerase II transcription; positive regulation of protein targeting to mitochondrion; mRNA processing; mRNA export from nucleus; regulation of autophagy of mitochondrion; RNA splicing; mRNA 3'-end processing; RNA export from nucleus; mRNA splicing, via spliceosome
Sources:Amigo / QuickGO
Orthologs
Databases	NCBI: entry; OMA: entry
Species	Human	Mouse
Entrez	7307	n/a
Ensembl	ENSG00000160201	n/a
UniProt	Q01081; P0DN76	n/a
RefSeq (mRNA)	NM_001025203; NM_001025204; NM_006758	n/a
RefSeq (protein)	NP_001307575; NP_001307577; NP_001307579; NP_001307580; NP_001020374 NP_001020375; NP_006749; NP_001020374; NP_001020375; NP_006749	n/a
Location (UCSC)	Chr 21: 43.09 – 43.11 Mb	n/a
PubMed search		n/a
- Wikidata
View/Edit Human

Splicing factor U2AF 35 kDa subunit is a protein that in humans is encoded by the U2AF1 gene.

== Function ==
This gene belongs to the splicing factor SR family of genes. U2AF1 is a subunit of the U2 Auxiliary Factor complex alongside a larger subunit, U2AF2. U2AF1 is a non-snRNP protein required for the binding of U2 snRNP to the pre-mRNA branch site. This gene encodes a small (~35 kDa) subunit that plays a critical role in RNA splicing by recognizing and binding to AG nucleotides at the 3’ splice site to facilitate spliceosome assembly. Alternatively spliced transcript variants encoding different isoforms have been identified. Somatic mutations in U2AF1 have been found in a range of human cancers, with a distinctive pattern of these mutations at the zinc fingers implicating a functional role under selection. In lung cancers, these mutations affect alternative splicing of several transcripts, including oncogenic ROS1 fusions. U2AF1 conditional deletion in mouse hematopoietic system leads to early lethality suggesting its important for hematopoietic stem cell maintenance and function {https://doi.org/10.1038/s41375-020-01116-x }.

== Interactions ==
U2 small nuclear RNA auxiliary factor 1 has been shown to interact with:

- ASF/SF2,
- NXF1,
- RP9,
- SMNDC1,
- U2AF2, and
- ZRANB2.
