= Serine/arginine-rich splicing factor 1 =

Protein-coding gene in the species Homo sapiens

SRSF1
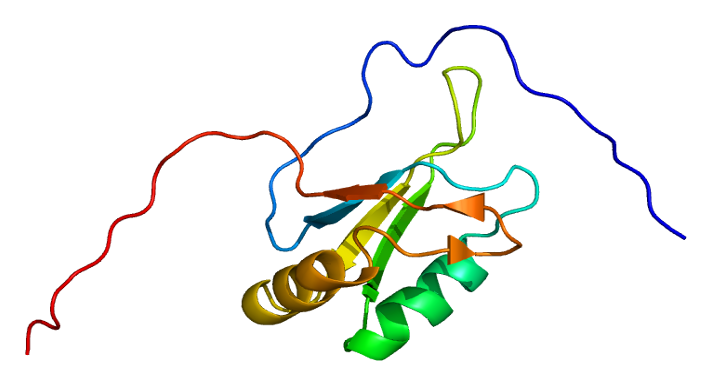

Identifiers
- Aliases: SRSF1, ASF, SF2, SF2p33, SFRS1, SRp30a, ASF/SF2, serine/arginine-rich splicing factor 1, serine and arginine rich splicing factor 1
- External IDs: OMIM: 600812; MGI: 98283; GeneCards: SRSF1
Available structures
PDB	Ortholog search: PDBe RCSB
PDB	List of PDB id codes 1X4A, 2M7S, 2M8D, 2O3D, 3BEG, 4C0O

Gene location (Human)
Chr.	Chromosome 17 (human)
Band	17q22	Start	58,000,919 bp
Band	17q22	End	58,007,346 bp

Gene location (Mouse)
Chr.	Chromosome 11 (mouse)
Band	11 C|11 52.4 cM	Start	87,938,199 bp
Band	11 C|11 52.4 cM	End	87,944,581 bp
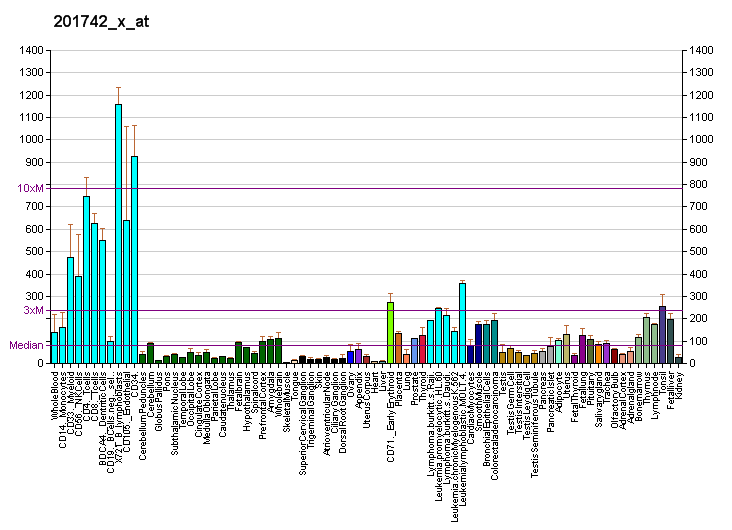

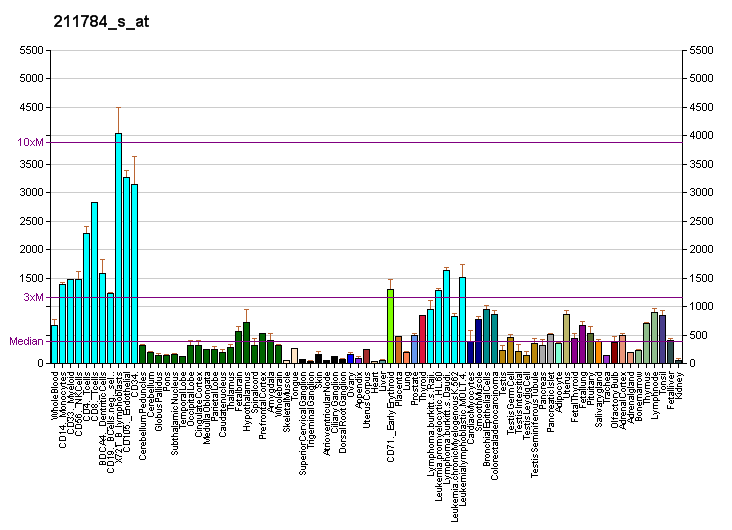

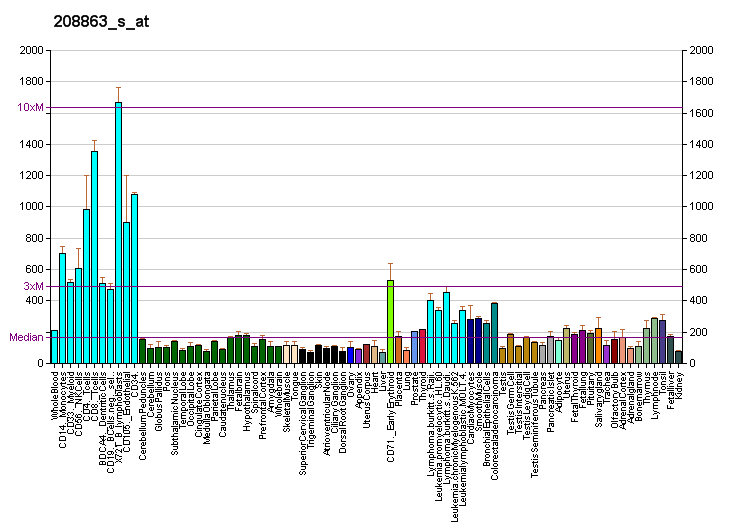
RNA expression pattern
Bgee	Human / Mouse (ortholog); Top expressed in: ganglionic eminence; ventricular zone; epithelium of colon; left ovary; body of uterus; rectum; Achilles tendon; right ovary; canal of the cervix; right uterine tube / Top expressed in: neural layer of retina; ventricular zone; tail of embryo; genital tubercle; spermatocyte; yolk sac; superior frontal gyrus; lip; esophagus; embryo; More reference expression data
BioGPS	More reference expression data
Gene ontology
Molecular function	RS domain binding; protein binding; RNA binding; nucleic acid binding; mRNA binding; protein kinase B binding; DNA topoisomerase binding
Cellular component	cytoplasm; nuclear speck; catalytic step 2 spliceosome; exon-exon junction complex; nucleoplasm; spliceosomal complex; extracellular exosome; nucleus
Biological process	mRNA splicing, via spliceosome; termination of RNA polymerase II transcription; mRNA transport; cardiac muscle contraction; mRNA processing; in utero embryonic development; mRNA export from nucleus; mRNA splice site selection; mRNA 5'-splice site recognition; mRNA 3'-end processing; liver regeneration; alternative mRNA splicing, via spliceosome; RNA splicing; oligodendrocyte differentiation; RNA export from nucleus; positive regulation of RNA splicing; transport; regulation of alternative mRNA splicing, via spliceosome; mRNA cis splicing, via spliceosome
Sources:Amigo / QuickGO
Orthologs
Databases	NCBI: entry; OMA: entry
Species	Human	Mouse
Entrez	6426	110809
Ensembl	ENSG00000136450	ENSMUSG00000018379
UniProt	Q07955	Q6PDM2
RefSeq (mRNA)	NM_001078166; NM_006924	NM_001078167; NM_173374
RefSeq (protein)	NP_001071634; NP_008855	NP_001071635; NP_775550
Location (UCSC)	Chr 17: 58 – 58.01 Mb	Chr 11: 87.94 – 87.94 Mb
PubMed search
- Wikidata
View/Edit Human	View/Edit Mouse

Serine/arginine-rich splicing factor 1 (SRSF1) also known as alternative splicing factor 1 (ASF1), pre-mRNA-splicing factor SF2 (SF2) or ASF1/SF2 is a protein that in humans is encoded by the SRSF1 gene. ASF/SF2 is an essential sequence specific splicing factor involved in pre-mRNA splicing. SRSF1 is the gene that codes for ASF/SF2 and is found on chromosome 17. The resulting splicing factor is a protein of approximately 33 kDa. ASF/SF2 is necessary for all splicing reactions to occur, and influences splice site selection in a concentration-dependent manner, resulting in alternative splicing. In addition to being involved in the splicing process, ASF/SF2 also mediates post-splicing activities, such as mRNA nuclear export and translation.

== Structure ==
ASF/SF2 is an SR protein, and as such, contains two functional modules: an arginine-serine rich region (RS domain), where the bulk of ASF/SF2 regulation takes place, and two RNA recognition motifs (RRMs), through which ASF/SF2 interacts with RNA and other splicing factors. These modules have different functions within general splicing factor function.

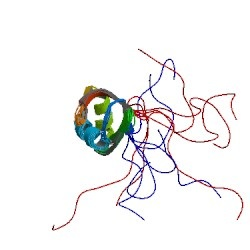
NMR structure of the second RRM domain of ASF/SF2 based on the PDB: 2O3D coordinates.

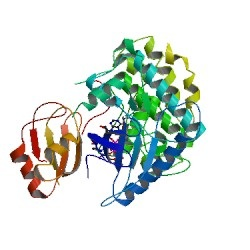
ASF/SF2 (left: red/orange/yellow) complexed with SRPK1 (right: blue/green/yellow) based on the 3BEG crystallographic coordinates.

== Splicing ==
ASF/SF2 is an integral part of numerous components of the splicing process. ASF/SF2 is required for 5’ splice site cleavage and selection, and is capable of discriminating between cryptic and authentic splice sites. Subsequent lariat formation during the first chemical step of pre-mRNA splicing also requires ASF/SF2. ASF/SF2 promotes recruitment of the U1 snRNP to the 5’ splice site, and bridges the 5’ and 3’ splice sites to facilitate splicing reactions. ASF/SF2 also associates with the U2 snRNP. During the reaction, ASF/SF2 promotes the use of intron proximal sites and hinders the use of intron distal sites, affecting alternative splicing. Alternative splicing is affected by ASF/SF2 in a concentration-dependent manner; differing concentrations of ASF/SF2 is a mechanism for alternative splicing regulation, and will result in differing amounts of product isoforms. ASF/SF2 accomplishes this regulation through direct or indirect binding to exonic splicing enhancer (ESE) sequences.

== Post-splicing ==
ASF/SF2, in the presence of elF4E, promotes the initiation of translation of ribosome-bound mRNA by suppressing the activity of 4E-BP and recruiting molecules for further regulation of translation. ASF/SF2 interacts with the nuclear export protein TAP in a regulated manner, controlling the export of mature mRNA from the nucleus. An increase in cellular ASF/SF2 also will increase the efficiency of nonsense-mediated mRNA decay (NMD), favoring NMD that occurs before mRNA release from the nucleus over NMD that occurs after mRNA export from the nucleus to the cytoplasm. This shift in NMD caused by increased ASF/SF2 is accompanied by overall enhancement of the pioneer round of translation, through elF4E-bound mRNA translation and subsequent translationally active ribosomes, increased association of pioneer translation initiation complexes with ASF/SF2, and increased levels of active TAP.

== Regulation through phosphorylation ==
ASF/SF2 has the ability to be phosphorylated at the serines in its RS domain by the SR specific protein kinase, SRPK1. SRPK1 and ASF/SF2 form an unusually stable complex of apparent K_{d} of 50nM. SRPK1 selectively phosphorylates up to twelve serines in the RS domain of ASF/SF2 through a directional and processive mechanism, moving from the C terminus to the N terminus. This multi-phosphorylation directs ASF/SF2 to the nucleus, influencing a number of protein-protein interactions associated with splicing. ASF/SF2's function in export of mature mRNA from the nucleus is dependent on its phosphorylation state; dephosphorylation of ASF/SF2 facilitates binding to TAP, while phosphorylation directs ASF/SF2 to nuclear speckles. Both phosphorylation and dephosphorylation of ASF/SF2 are important and necessary for proper splicing to occur, as sequential phosphorylation and dephosphorylation marks the transitions between stages in the splicing process. In addition, hypophosphorylation and hyperphosphorylation of ASF/SF2 by Clk/Sty can lead to inhibition of splicing.

== Biological importance ==
=== Stability and fidelity ===
ASF/SF2 is involved in genomic stability; it is thought that RNA Polymerase recruits ASF/SF2 to nascent RNA transcripts to impede formation of mutagenic DNA:RNA hybrid R-loop structures between the transcript and the template DNA. In this way, ASF/SF2 is protecting cells from the potential deleterious effects of transcription itself. ASF/SF2 is also implicated in cellular mechanisms to hinder exon skipping and to ensure splicing is occurring accurately and correctly.

=== Development and growth ===
ASF/SF2 has been shown to have a critical function in heart development, embryogenesis, tissue formation, cell motility, and cell viability in general. SRSF1 is a regulator of aging.

== Clinical significance ==
SFRS1 is a proto-oncogene, and thus ASF/SF2 can act as an oncoprotein; it can alter the splicing patterns of crucial cell cycle regulatory genes and suppressor genes. ASF/SF2 controls the splicing of various tumor suppressor genes, kinases, and kinase receptors, all of which have the potential to be alternatively spliced into oncogenic isoforms. As such, ASF/SF2 is an important target for cancer therapy, as it is over-expressed in many tumors.

Modifications and defects in the alternative splicing pathway are associated with a variety of human diseases.

ASF/SF2 is involved in the replication of HIV-1, as HIV-1 needs a delicate balance of spliced and unspliced forms of its viral DNA. ASF/SF2 action in the replication of HIV-1 is a potential target for HIV therapy. ASF/SF2 is also implicated in the production of T cell receptors in Systemic Lupus Erythematosus, altering specific chain expression in T cell receptors through alternative splicing.

== Interactions ==
ASF/SF2 has been shown to interact with:

- CDC5L,
- CLK1,
- PSIP1,
- SRSF2,
- SRPK1,
- SRPK2,
- TOP1,
- U2 small nuclear RNA auxiliary factor 1, and
- snRNP70.
