= SRSF2 =

Protein-coding gene in humans

Identifiers
- Aliases: SRSF2, PR264, SC-35, SC35, SFRS2, SFRS2A, SRp30b, serine/arginine-rich splicing factor 2, serine and arginine rich splicing factor 2
- External IDs: OMIM: 600813; MGI: 98284; GeneCards: SRSF2
Available structures
PDB	Ortholog search: PDBe RCSB
PDB	List of PDB id codes 2KN4, 2LEA, 2LEB, 2LEC

Gene location (Human)
Chr.	Chromosome 17 (human)
Band	17q25.1	Start	76,734,115 bp
Band	17q25.1	End	76,737,333 bp

Gene location (Mouse)
Chr.	Chromosome 11 (mouse)
Band	11 E2|11 81.49 cM	Start	116,849,901 bp
Band	11 E2|11 81.49 cM	End	116,853,094 bp
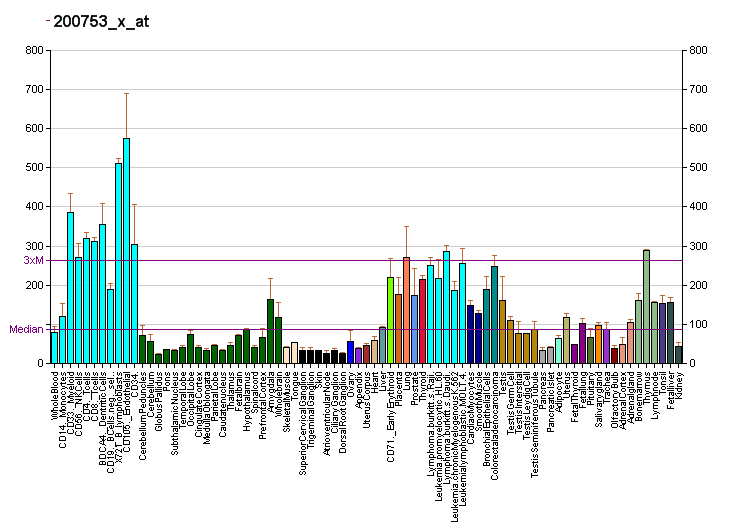

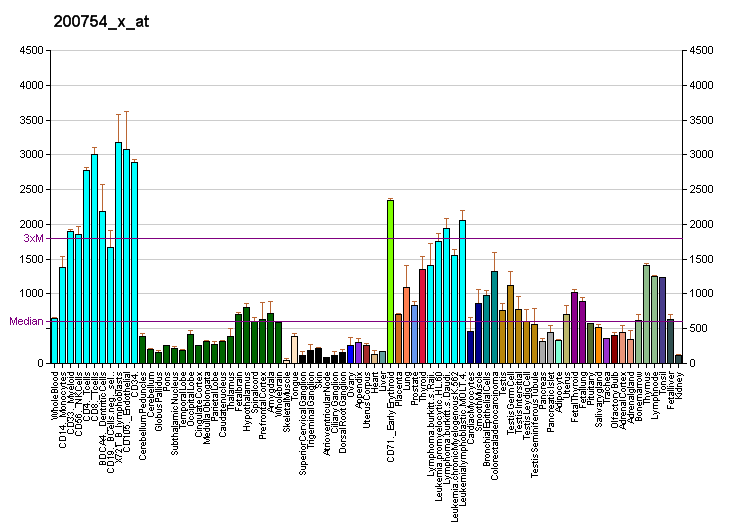

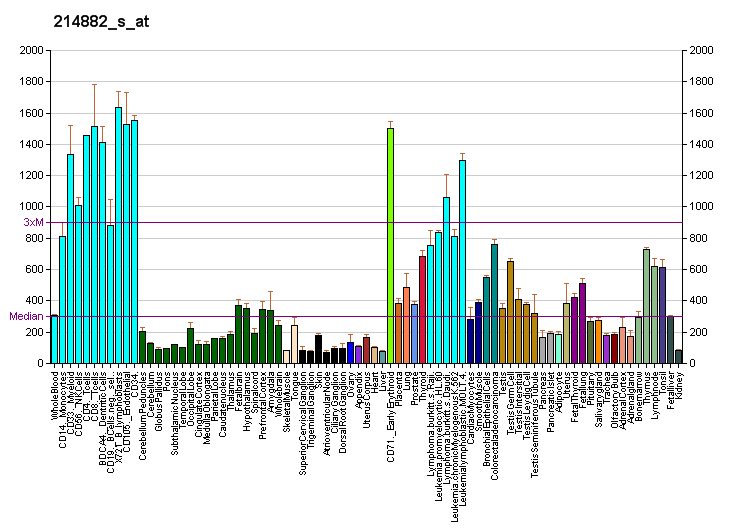
RNA expression pattern
Bgee	Human / Mouse (ortholog); Top expressed in: tibia; embryo; tendon of biceps brachii; thymus; ventricular zone; ganglionic eminence; granulocyte; male germ cell; sperm; lymph node / Top expressed in: corneal stroma; otic placode; tail of embryo; otic vesicle; Ileal epithelium; superior surface of tongue; genital tubercle; medial ganglionic eminence; saccule; lactiferous gland; More reference expression data
BioGPS	More reference expression data
Gene ontology
Molecular function	transcription corepressor activity; protein binding; nucleic acid binding; RNA binding; protein kinase C binding; pre-mRNA binding
Cellular component	PML body; nuclear speck; nucleoplasm; extracellular exosome; nucleus; cytosol; spliceosomal complex; interchromatin granule; cytoplasm
Biological process	mRNA splicing, via spliceosome; termination of RNA polymerase II transcription; mRNA processing; mRNA export from nucleus; RNA splicing; mRNA 3'-end processing; RNA export from nucleus; negative regulation of nucleic acid-templated transcription; mitotic cell cycle; regulation of alternative mRNA splicing, via spliceosome; response to vitamin E; regulation of RNA splicing; mRNA cis splicing, via spliceosome
Sources:Amigo / QuickGO
Orthologs
Databases	NCBI: entry; OMA: entry
Species	Human	Mouse
Entrez	6427	20382
Ensembl	ENSG00000161547	ENSMUSG00000034120
UniProt	Q01130	Q62093
RefSeq (mRNA)	NM_001195427; NM_003016	NM_011358
RefSeq (protein)	NP_001182356; NP_003007	NP_035488
Location (UCSC)	Chr 17: 76.73 – 76.74 Mb	Chr 11: 116.85 – 116.85 Mb
PubMed search
- Wikidata
View/Edit Human	View/Edit Mouse

Serine/arginine-rich splicing factor 2 is a protein that in humans is encoded by the SRSF2 gene. MDS-associated splicing factor SRSF2 affects the expression of Class III and Class IV isoforms and perturbs granulopoiesis and SRSF2 P95H promotes Class IV splicing by binding to key ESE sequences in CSF3R exon 17, and that SRSF2, when mutated, contributes to dysgranulopoiesis.

== Interactions ==
SFRS2 has been shown to interact with CDC5L and ASF/SF2.
