= Kelch protein =

Kelch motif
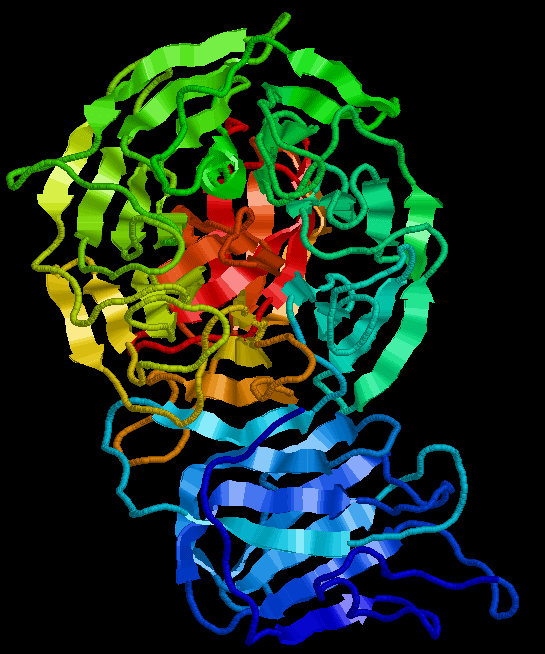

Identifiers
- Symbol: Kelch_1
- Pfam: PF01344
- InterPro: IPR006652
- SCOP2: 1gof / SCOPe / SUPFAM
Available protein structures:
- PDB: 1u6dX:459–504 1zgkA:459–504 1goh :311–357 1gof :311–357 1gog :311–357 IPR006652 PF01344 (ECOD; PDBsum)
- AlphaFold: IPR006652; PF01344

Kelch proteins (and Kelch-like proteins) are a widespread group of proteins that contain multiple Kelch motifs. The kelch domain generally occurs as a set of five to seven kelch tandem repeats that form a β-propeller tertiary structure. Kelch-repeat β-propellers are generally involved in protein–protein interactions, though the large diversity of domain architectures and limited sequence identity between kelch motifs make characterisation of the kelch superfamily difficult.

== Structure ==
The N-terminus of several Kelch proteins contain other protein domains, including Discoidin, F-box, and Broad-complex, Tramtrack, Bric-a-Brac/Poxvirus Zinc finger (BTB/POZ) domains. Kelch proteins may also only have a β-propeller architecture. The BTB domain of kelch proteins (if present) allows the formation of homo- or heterodimers that mediate protein–protein interactions.

The C-terminus of Kelch proteins contains kelch repeats. Each kelch repeat is a sequence of 44–55 amino acids in length, usually occurring in clusters of 4 – 7 repeats.

Each kelch repeat forms a "blade" of the β-propeller fold, consisting of a four-stranded antiparallel β-sheet secondary structure, arranged radially around a central axis, packed onto its adjoining repeats via hydrophobic contacts.

Kelch-repeat β-propellers undergo a variety of binding interactions with other proteins, notably the actin filaments of a cell.

== Function ==
Kelch-like proteins are known to act as substrate adaptors for Cullin 3 ubiquitin ligases.

== Organisms ==
The first Kelch protein (from which this family derives its name) was isolated from Drosophila, in which Kelch-mutant females lay sterile, cup-shaped eggs; The word Kelch is German for 'chalice, cup'. Kelch proteins have also been isolated in many other animals, plants, bacteria, fungi, and even virus (restricted to Poxviridae).

== Human proteins containing Kelch motifs ==
ATRN; ATRNL1; CCIN; ENC1; FBXO42; GAN; HCFC1; HCFC2; IPP; IVNS1ABP; KBTBD2; KBTBD3; KBTBD4; KBTBD5; KBTBD6; KBTBD7; KBTBD8; KBTBD11; KEAP1; KIAA1900; KLHDC1; KLHDC2; KLHDC3; KLHDC4; KLHDC5; KLHDC6; KLHDC7A; KLHDC7B; KLHDC8A; KLHDC8B; KLHDC9; KLHDC10; KLHL1; KLHL2; KLHL3; KLHL4; KLHL5; KLHL6; KLHL7; KLHL8; KLHL9; KLHL10; KLHL11; KLHL12; KLHL13; KLHL14; KLHL15; KLHL17; KLHL18; KLHL20; KLHL21; KLHL22; KLHL23; KLHL24; KLHL25; KLHL26; KLHL28; KLHL29;KLHL30; KLHL31; KLHL32; KLHL34; KLHL40; KLHL41; LZTR1; MEGF8; MKLN1; RABEPK;
