= Kelch-like protein 28 =

Protein found in humans

KLHL28

Identifiers
- Aliases: KLHL28, BTBD5, kelch like family member 28
- External IDs: MGI: 1913939; GeneCards: KLHL28

Gene location (Human)
Chr.	Chromosome 14 (human)
Band	14q21.2	Start	44,924,324 bp
Band	14q21.2	End	45,042,322 bp

Gene location (Mouse)
Chr.	Chromosome 12 (mouse)
Band	12|12 C1	Start	64,985,607 bp
Band	12|12 C1	End	65,012,308 bp
RNA expression pattern
Bgee	Human / Mouse (ortholog); Top expressed in: secondary oocyte; sperm; pancreatic epithelial cell; mucosa of ileum; visceral pleura; parietal pleura; gingival epithelium; deltoid muscle; tibialis anterior muscle; middle temporal gyrus / Top expressed in: olfactory epithelium; Rostral migratory stream; trigeminal ganglion; otolith organ; utricle; hand; spermatid; medial ganglionic eminence; epithelium of lens; Region I of hippocampus proper; More reference expression data
BioGPS	n/a
Gene ontology
Molecular function	ubiquitin-protein transferase activity
Cellular component	Cul3-RING ubiquitin ligase complex
Biological process	protein ubiquitination
Sources:Amigo / QuickGO
Orthologs
Databases	NCBI: entry; OMA: entry
Species	Human	Mouse
Entrez	54813	66689
Ensembl	ENSG00000179454	ENSMUSG00000020948
UniProt	Q9NXS3	Q9CR40
RefSeq (mRNA)	NM_001308112; NM_017658	NM_025707
RefSeq (protein)	NP_001295041; NP_060128	NP_079983
Location (UCSC)	Chr 14: 44.92 – 45.04 Mb	Chr 12: 64.99 – 65.01 Mb
PubMed search
- Wikidata
View/Edit Human	View/Edit Mouse

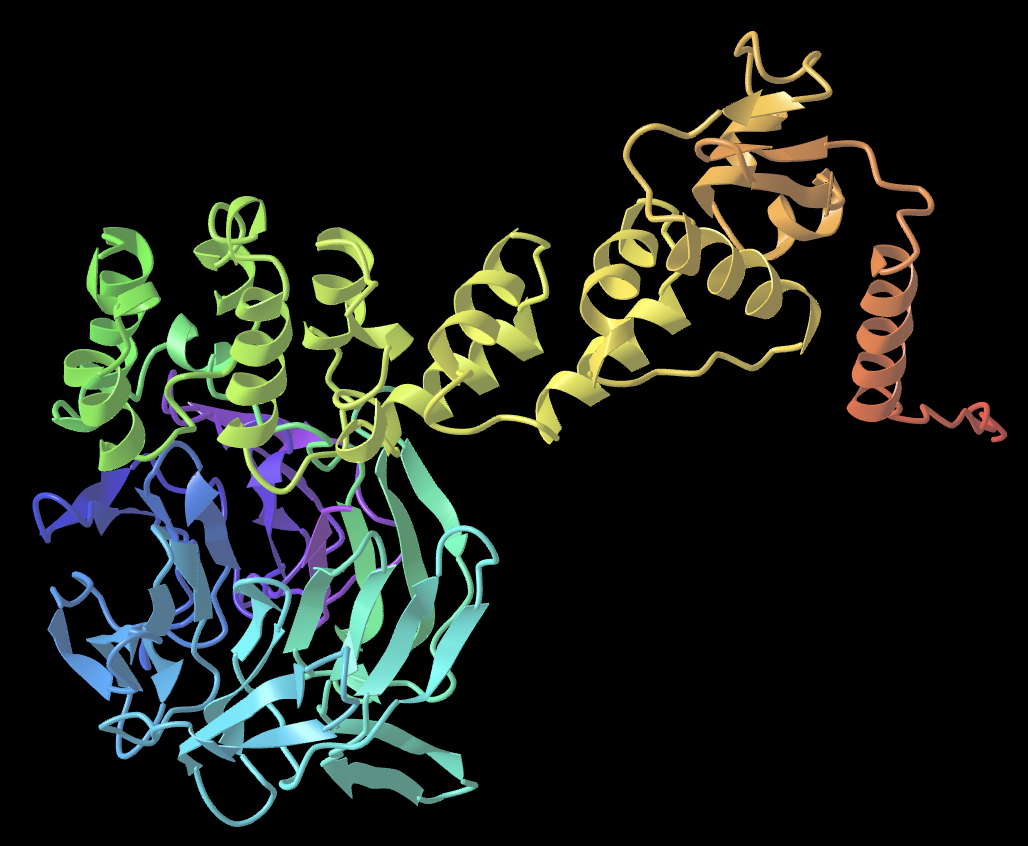
Sequential rainbow 3D tertiary protein structure of human KLHL28 modeled using NCBI Structure.

Kelch-like protein 28 (KLHL28) is a protein that is encoded by the KLHL28 gene in humans. It is a member of the Kelch-like gene family, which comprises 42 different genes. Aberrant activation of KLHL28 results in increased likelihood of hypertension, hyperkalemia, and cancer. The KLHL28 gene, also known as BTBD5, has orthologs in vertebrates and some marine invertebrates, and has been well-conserved over evolutionary timescales.

== Gene ==
The KLHL28 gene is located on the negative strand of human Chromosome 14 (14q21.2) and spans 7019 base pairs in its complete isoform (isoform 1).

=== Transcription factors ===
Hundreds of transcription factors are predicted to bind to the promoter region. Many of the highly scored transcription factors from the JASPAR database via the University of California, Santa Cruz Genome Browser are listed in the table below.

Transcription Factors for Human KLHL28
Transcription factor	Binding Region	Strand	Function
ZNF652 (Zinc Finger Protein 652)	aagagtt	+	Transcription repressor
FOXH1 (Forkhead Box H1)	aatcccaa	−	Transcription in nodal expression
ETV4 (ETS Variant 4)	accggagct	+	Promotes proliferation
FEZF2 (FEZ Family Zinc Finger 2)	cccagg	+	Regulates corticospinal motor neuron genes
TGIF2LY (TGFB Induced Factor Homeobox 2-like Y-linked)	ctccagttgtcc	+	Regulates RNA Polymerase II in males
TGIF2 (TG-Interacting Factor 2)	tgaccacgatct	−	Regulates brain development
ZBED4 (Zinc Finger BED-Type Containing 4)	ttctctccgc	−	Regulates genes involved in retinal function
ZNF708 (Zinc Finger Protein 708)	tgtagaa	−	Regulates RNA Polymerase II, carcinoma
ELF1 (E74-like ETS TF1)	ctaggaaag	−	Regulates homeostasis and vascular development
Msgn1 (Mesogenin 1)	cacaaatcgg	+	Regulates mesoderm fate
KLF2 (Krüppel-like Factor 2)	ccccgg	−	Regulates differentiation
ELK1 (ETS-like Kinase 1)	aaat	−	Regulates early gene experession via serum response
KLF14 (Krüppel-like Factor 14)	tggga	−	Regulates lipid metabolism
SP4 (Specificity Protein 4)	gtag	−	Regulates cytochrome C in primary neurons
Spi1 (Spleen Focus Forming Virus Proviral Integration Oncogene)	aaagaaatgttgc	−	Regulates development and function of microglia
TBX20 (T-Box TF20)	taggtctgttt	+	Regulates cardiac development
ZNF530 (Zinc Finger Protein 530)	ggcggagagggaa	−	Regulates RNA Polymerase II
MAZ (Myc-associated Zinc Finger Protein)	cccctccg	+	Regulates transcription in neural stem cells
ZNF263 (Zinc Finger 263)	gggaggc	−	Upregulates IL-33, promotes lung cancer
SPIB (Spi-B TF)	tcacttgcggt	+	Regulates M-cell differentiation

=== Expression ===
KLHL28 is ubiquitously expressed under normal physiological conditions in humans and has been found not to be monallelically expressed. DNA microarray data also suggests that gene expression of KLHL28 is elevated in the brain and heart.

Under hypoxic conditions, DNA microarray data illustrated increased expression of KLHL28. Further, in a DNA microarray study of small-cell lung cancer, KLHL28 was expressed at significantly higher levels than the control. These data indicate that the gene's transcription is impacted by the tumor microenvironment, which is typically not well-vascularized and often hypoxic.

=== Mutations ===
Missense single nucleotide polymorphisms (SNPs) have been identified in both the coding and noncoding regions of the gene. The SNPs with the potential for most clinical significance are those affecting the composition of the KLHL28 protein, specifically within Kelch motif 1 (rs117295933, C>A / C>G / C>T) and motif 3 (rs35352691, T>G).

== mRNA and transcriptional variants ==
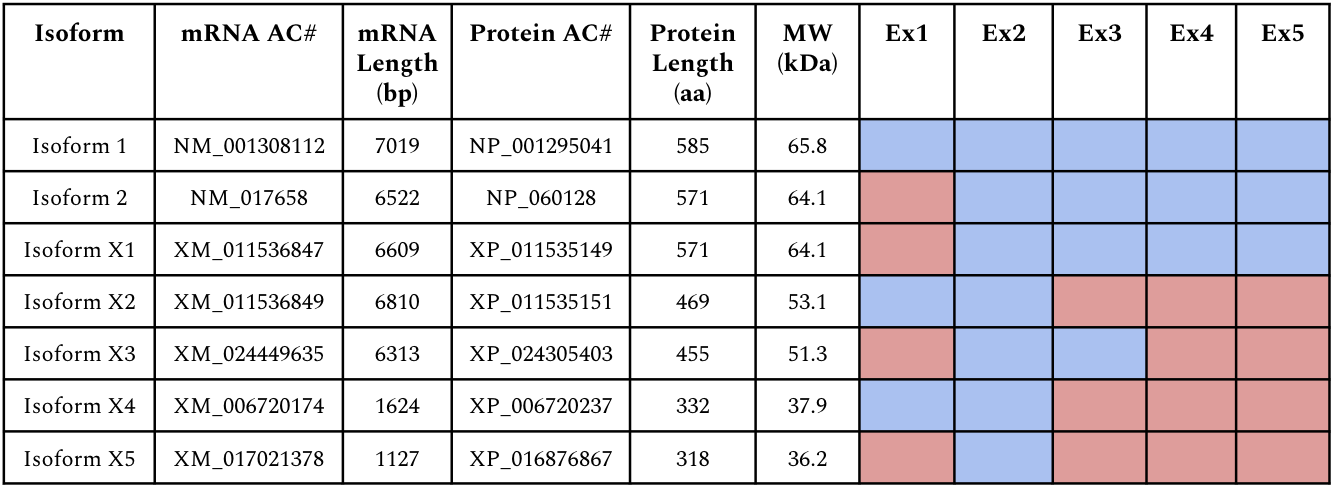
Transcript variants and protein isoforms of the KLHL28 gene in Homo sapiens. Blue boxes indicate the exon is present in the transcript variant, while red boxes indicate the exon is absent.

There are a total of seven transcriptional variants: two isoforms and five spliced transcript variants, all of which are based on the longest transcript, isoform 1. Isoform 1 contains five exons, and all transcriptional variants contain at least exon 2. The six conserved Kelch motifs in the KLHL28 protein are found through the end of exon 2 through exon 5.

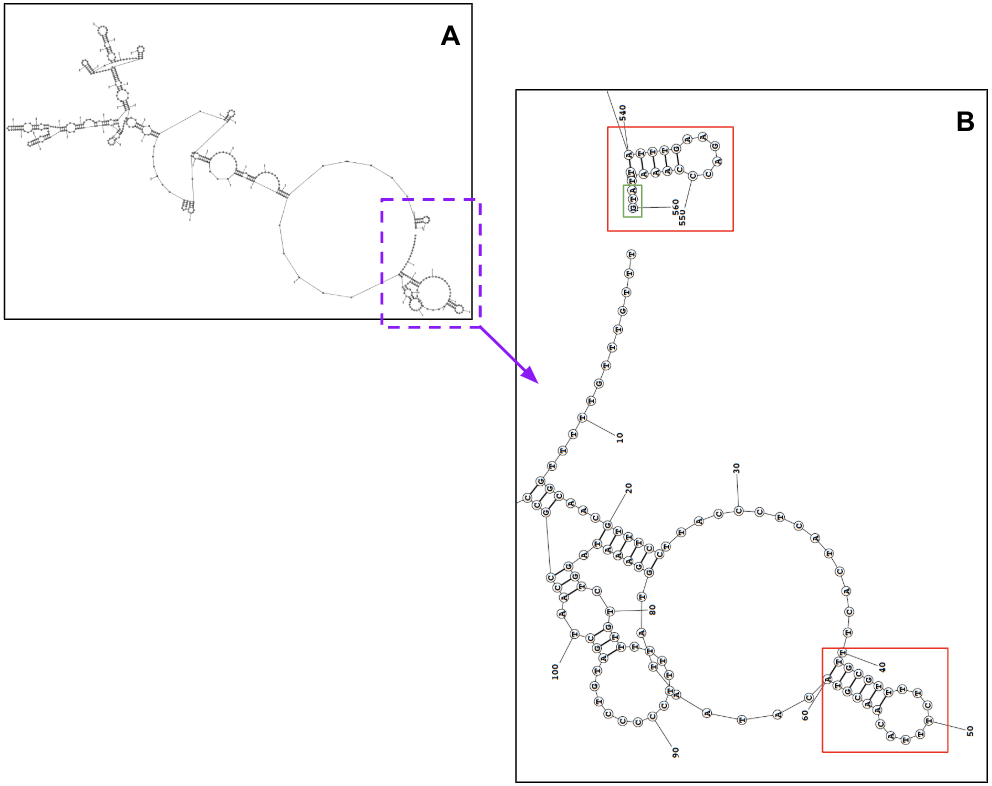
The predicted secondary mRNA structure for the human KLHL28 5' untranslated region (UTR) created using RNAstructure. The folding free energy of this structure is −122.6 kcal/mol. A) Zoomed-out view of the entire 5' UTR. B) An enhanced image of the UTR start and end (ATG in green) and conserved stem-loop structures (red boxes).

=== 5' Untranslated region ===
The 5' untranslated region (5' UTR) of KLHL28 is well-conserved amongst orthologs, similar to the protein sequence. Demonstrating this conservation, the transcription factor ZNF263 was conserved after a five-member mammalian multiple sequence alignment (MSA) using the orthologs golden snub-nosed monkey, green monkey, southern pig-tailed macaque, and thirteen-lined ground squirrel.

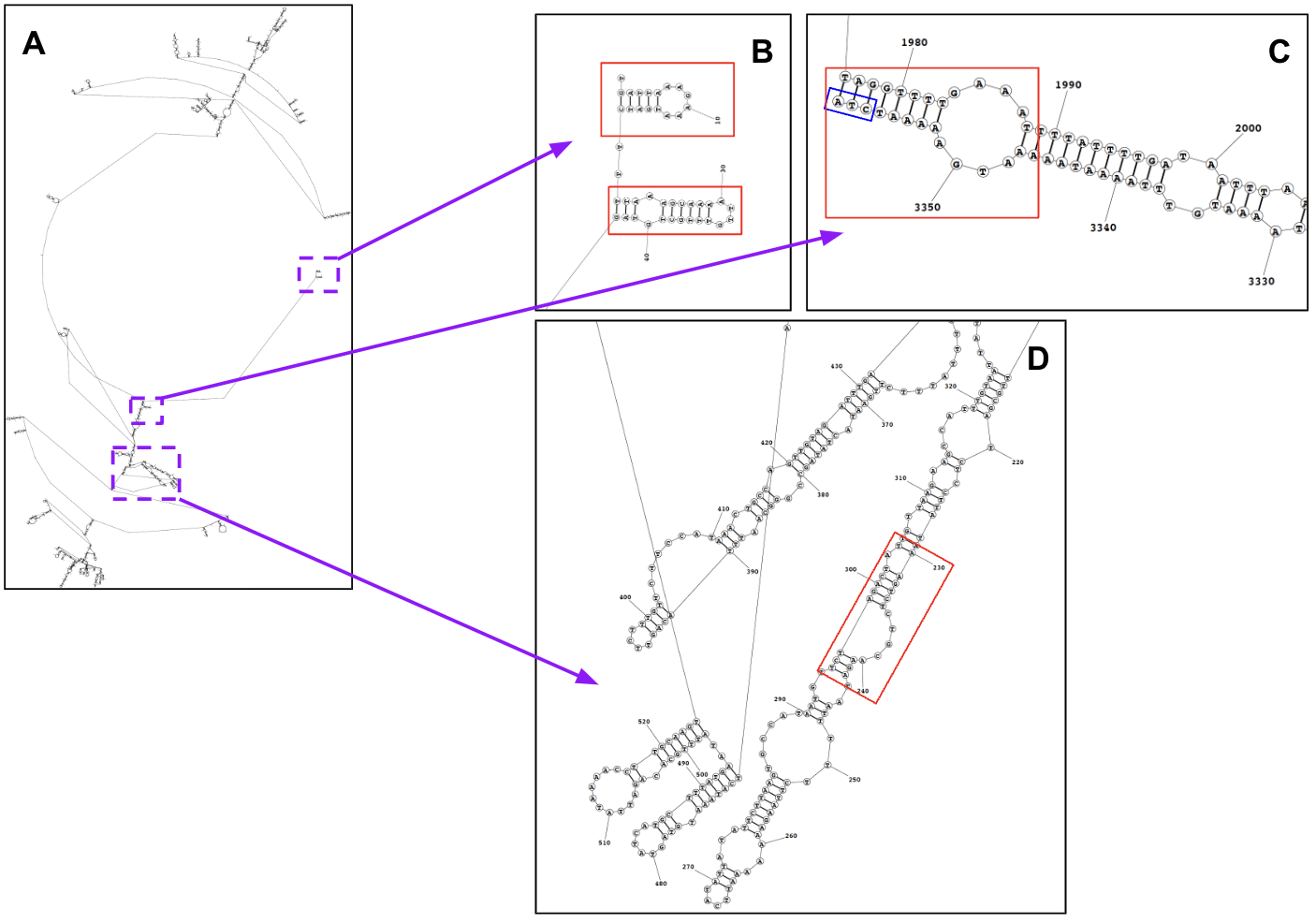
The predicted secondary mRNA structure for the human KLHL28 3' untranslated region (UTR) created using RNAstructure. The folding free energy of this structure is −748.2 kcal/mol. A) Zoomed-out view of the entire 3' UTR. B) An enhanced image of the 3' UTR start. C) An enhanced image of the polyA site (blue box). D) An enhanced image of a section of stem-loops strongly conserved across simulated structural models.

=== 3' Untranslated region ===
A four-member MSA was run for the 3' UTR and found that, like the 5' UTR, it was strongly conserved across primates, with the same orthologs as in the 5' UTR section, minus the thirteen-lined ground squirrel.

=== RNA binding protein interactions ===
An analysis of the miRNA binding capacity of the KLHL28 isoform 1 transcript returned with only one miRNA target that was found on the 3' UTR and conserved through mammals. The miRNA, hsa-miR-182-5p, has been associated with tumorigenesis, specifically in lung tissue.

RNA binding protein binding capacity for the 3' UTR of human KLHL28 was assessed and returned with 12 repeats of ELAVL2, 2 of SNRPA, 3 of ZFP36, and 1 of pum. Based on these highly probable predicted RNA binding proteins, KLHL28 expression at the RNA level is predicted to be connected to neural development during embryogenesis and differentiation.

== Protein ==
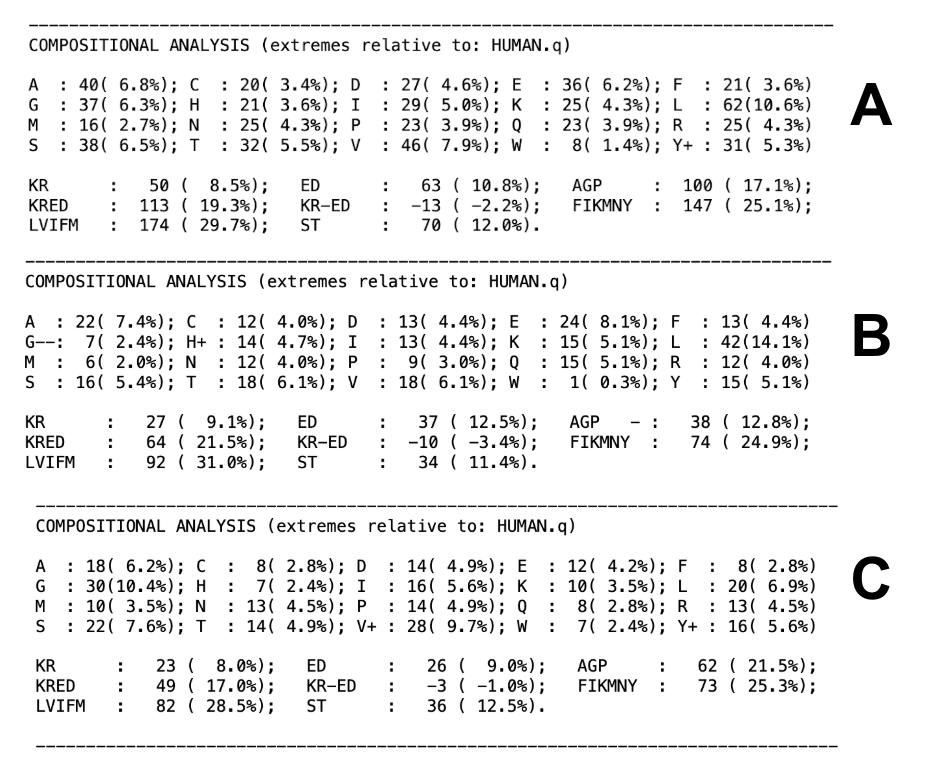
Amino acid composition of human KLHL28 using statistical analysis of protein sequences (SAPS) online tool. A) Entire KLHL28 protein. B) BTB domain. C) Kelch region.

=== Amino acid composition ===
The KLHL28 gene encodes the KLHL28 protein which is 585 amino acids long and has a molecular weight of 65.8kDa. The theoretical isoelectric point (Ip) was predicted to be 5.90 based on the amino acid composition.

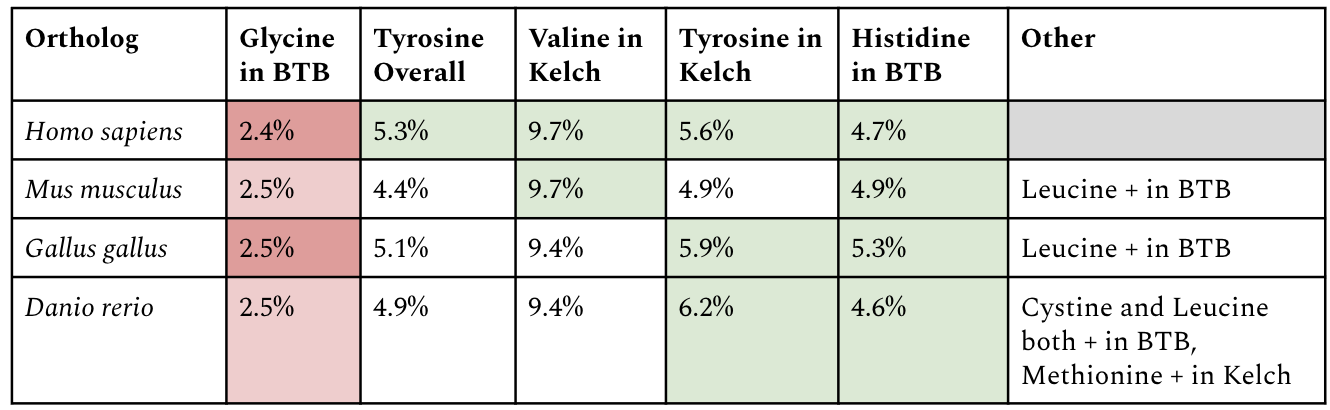
Comparing amino acid composition of the KLHL28 isoform 1 protein and protein domains between Homo sapiens orthologs using statistical analysis of protein sequences (SAPS). Green indicates the amino acid is rich in the protein/domain, while red indicates it is poor. Color intensity corresponds to how rich/poor, with − and + being the lightest and −− and ++ being darkest.

An analysis of the whole protein indicated that it is tyrosine-rich (5.3%); however, amino acids at the domain level were expressed differently. The broad-complex, tramtrack, and bric-á-brac (BTB) and BACK (BTB and C-terminal Kelch) domains were extremely glycine-poor (2.4%) and also histidine-rich (4.7%). On the other hand, the Kelch domains were rich in both valine (9.7%) and tyrosine (5.6%).

=== Protein domains ===
The protein can be broken down into eight domains: the Broad-complex, Tramtrack, and Bric-á-brac (BTB) domain (amino acids 31-148); the BACK domain (amino acids 151-253); and Kelch domains 1 (amino acids 298-345), 2 (amino acids 346-400), 3 (amino acids 401-444), 4 (amino acids 445-493), 5 (amino acids 494-541), 6 (amino acids 542-585). The high predicted isoelectric point of Kelch domain 3 indicates it may have an important role in forming the Cullin3-RING E3 ubiquitin ligase complex.

Annotated Protein Domains in KLHL28
KLHL28	pI	MW (in kDa)	Residues
Whole Protein	5.90	65.8	585
BTB Domain	4.92	13.2	118
BACK Domain	4.43	13.1	113
Kelch 1	4.11	5.3	48
Kelch 2	5.71	6.1	55
Kelch 3	8.95	4.9	44
Kelch 4	5.38	5.4	49
Kelch 5	7.02	5.4	48
Kelch 6	5.30	4.8	44

=== Post-translational modifications ===
Predicted post-translational modifications (PTMs) of the protein include a number of phosphorylation sites, visualized in the linear protein schematic to the right.

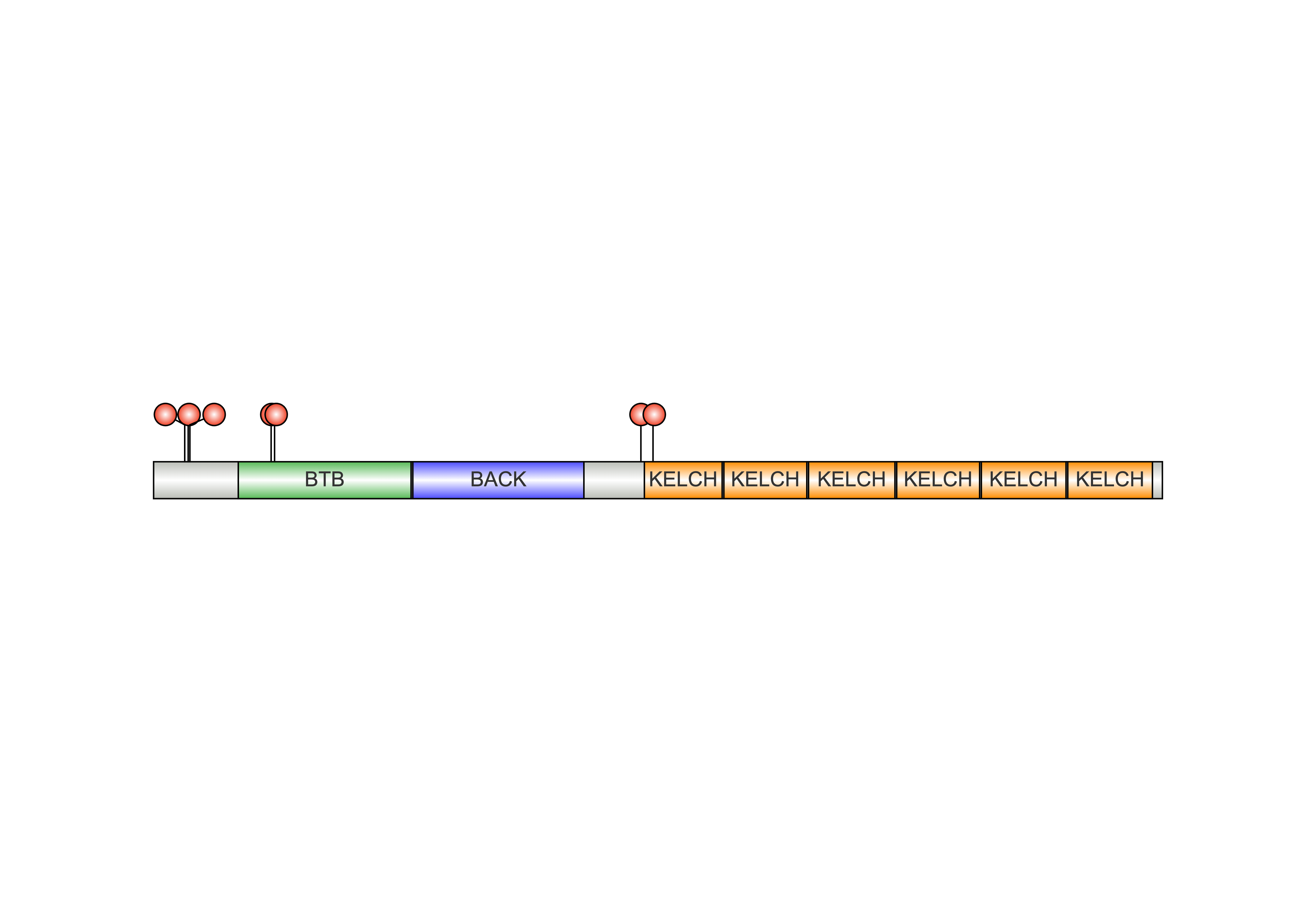
A schematic of the protein domains and predicted post-translational modifications for human KLHL28 created using IBS2.0. Red markers indicate phosphorylation sites.

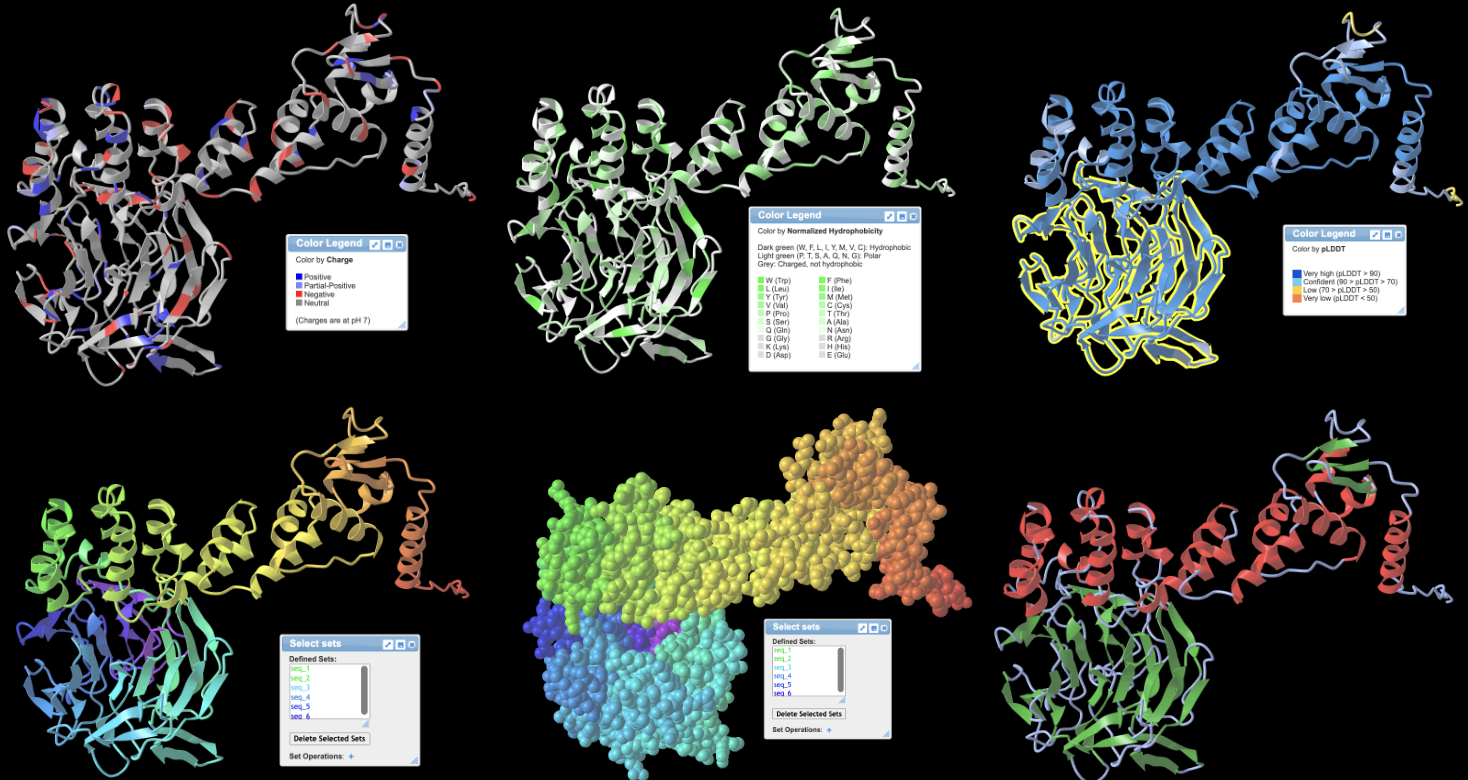
Visualizations of human KLHL28 protein using NCBI Structure: A) Charge; B) Hydrophobicity; C) Kelch motifs, highlighted in yellow; D) Rainbow, N to C terminus; E) Rainbow sphere; and F) Secondary structure.

=== Tertiary structure ===
The BTB and BACK domains are predicted with high confidence to mostly fold into alpha helices. Meanwhile, the Kelch domains in the protein form into beta sheets, which are then expected to complex into a beta barrel. No hydrophobic regions were identified on the protein, indicating that it is most likely not cell or organelle membrane-localized.

=== Protein localization ===
KLHL28 protein is soluble, localized in the cytoplasm, and is predicted to contain a nuclear localization signal.

=== Function ===
Based on the protein-protein interaction (PPI) network below, the KLHL28 protein is predicted to play a critical role in the formation and function of the E3 ubiquitin ligase complex involved in protein degradation and recycling. Additionally, the component domains of the protein suggest it may also be involved in orienting the substrate protein entering the Cullin3-based E3 ligase complex.

=== Protein-protein interaction network ===
The majority of identified proteins found to interact with the KLHL28 protein in humans are involved in the E3 ubiquitin ligase structure. The table below illustrates proteins interacting with human KLHL28 protein and their detection methods based on a consensus of high-throughput screening data reported from STRING, BioGRID, MINT, and IntAct databases.

KLHL28 Protein-Protein Interaction Network
Gene	Localization	Detection Method	Function
CUL3 (Cullin-3)	Cytosol/nucleus	Affinity capture-MS	Core component of E3 ubiquitin ligase complex
AKAP11 (A-Kinase Anchoring Protein-11)	Cytosol/nucleus	Affinity capture-MS	Enables protein kinase A binding in somatic and germ cells
CUL7 (Cullin-7)	Cytosol/nucleus/Golgi	Affinity capture-MS	Aids in E3 ubiquitin ligase assembly
FBXL17 (F-Box and Leucine-rich Repeat Protein 17)	Cytosol/nucleus	Affinity capture-MS	Forms SCF complexes, acts as protein ubiquitin ligases
IPP (Inracisternal A Particle-promoted Polypeptide)	Cytosol/cytoskeleton	Affinity capture-MS	Actin organization
KLHL13 (Kelch-like Homolog 13)	Cytosol/mitochondrion	Affinity capture-MS	Aids in E3 ubiquitin ligase assembly, necessary for chromosome segregation
KLHL14 (Kelch-like Homolog 14)	ER/cytoskeleton/cytosol	Affinity capture-MS	Tumor suppressor, promotes ubiquitination of B cell receptors
KLHL21 (Kelch-like Homolog 21)	Cytoskeleton/cytosol	Affinity capture-MS	Implicated with ubiquitin protein transferase activity
NSP1 (Novel SH2-containing Protein 1)	Cytosol/nucleus	Two-hybrid	May play a role in JNK (Jun N-terminal kinase) activation under stress conditions

=== Evolution ===
Based on the ortholog data in the table below, the KLHL28 gene first appeared in some marine invertebrates nearly 700 million years ago. The gene is found in some mollusks, cnidarians, and echinoderms, but not in arthropods nor cephalopods. Other members of the gene family (paralogs of KLHL28, such as KLHL20) have been identified in plants, bacteria, and archaea, indicating that the Kelch-like homologs are highly conserved across evolutionary time and likely serve an important role.

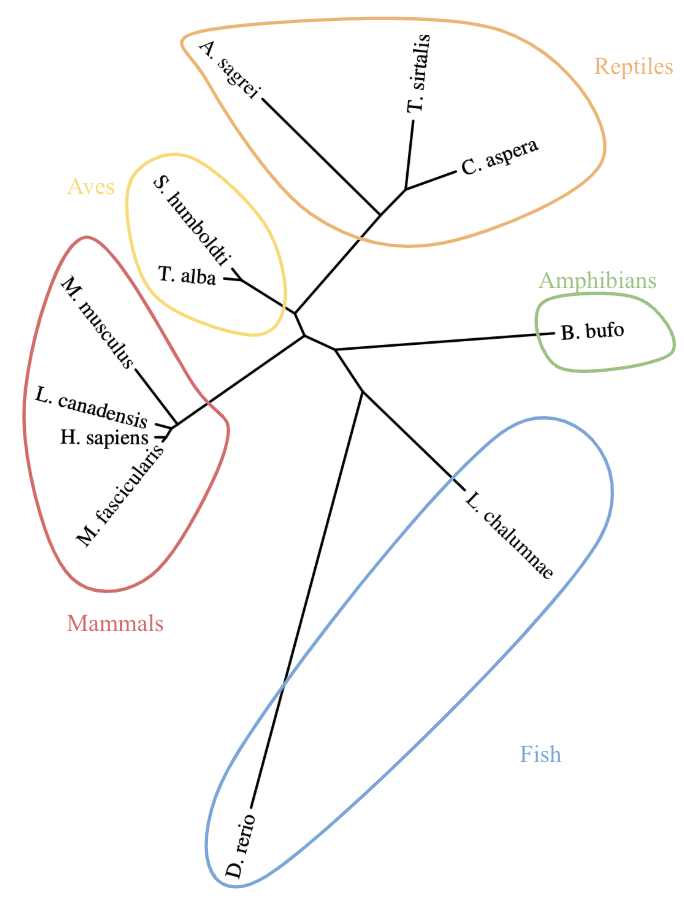
Unrooted phylogenetic tree illustrating KLHL28 gene similarity across evolutionary time and groups. M. fascicularis is Crab-eating macaque, L. canadensis is Canada lynx, M. musculus is Mouse, T. alba is Barn owl, S. humboldti is Humboldt penguin, A. sagrei is Brown anole, T. sirtalis is Garter snake, C. aspera is Ground boa, B. bufo is Toad, L. chalumnae is Coelacanth, and D. rerio is Zebrafish.

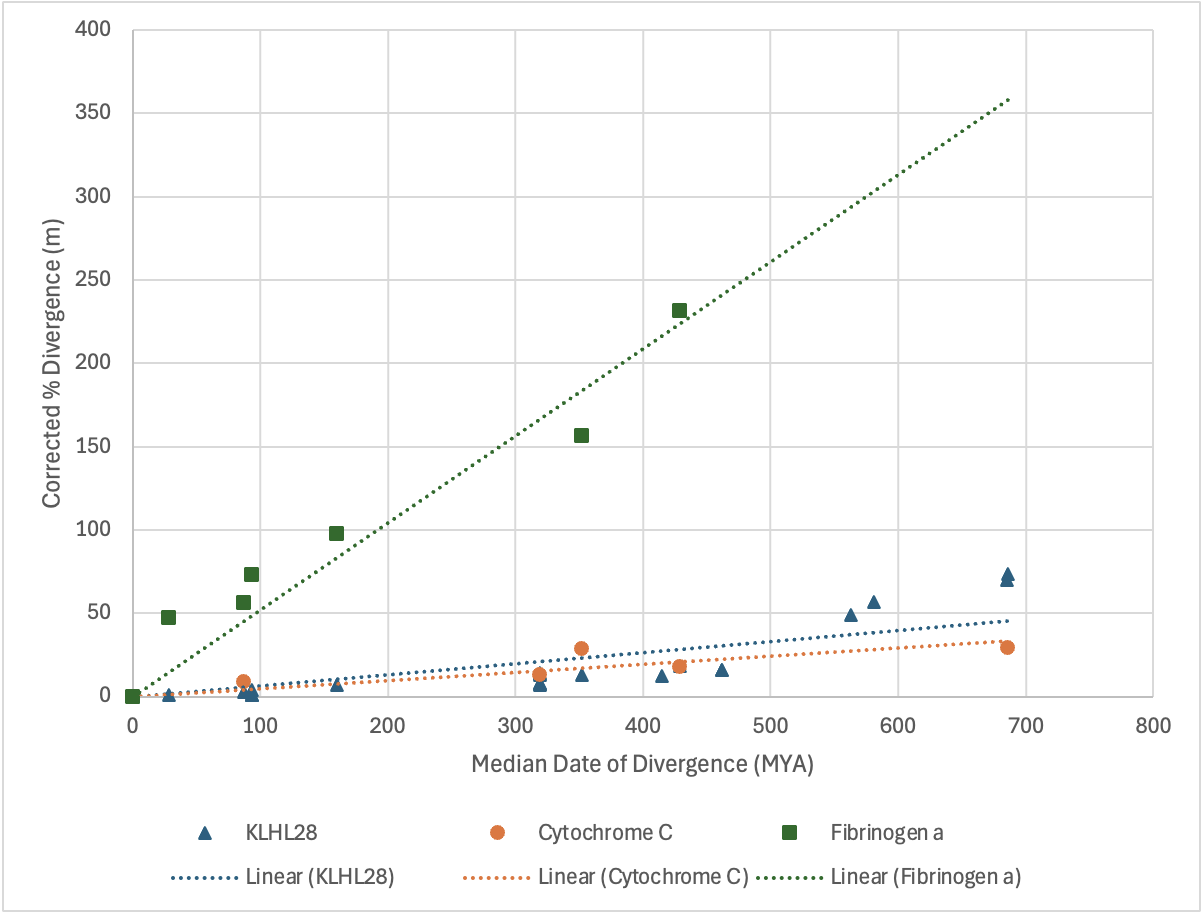
A scatterplot graph comparing the corrected divergence (m) between human KLHL28 and its orthologs (blue triangles), human Cytochrome C (orange circles), and human Fibrinogen a (green squares).

==== Orthologs ====
Selected Orthologs of KLHL28
Common name	Taxonomic group	Median Date of Divergence (MYA)	Protein Accession #	Sequence length (aa)	Identity to Human (%)	Similarity to Human (%)
Human	Primates	0	NP_001295041.1	585	100.0	100.0
Crab-eating Macaque	Primates	28.8	XP_015308707.1	585	99.2	99.3
Canada Lynx	Carnivora	94	XP_030174874.1	571	98.8	97.3
Sack-winged Bat	Chiroptera	94	XP_066133942.1	571	96.3	97.1
House Mouse	Rodentia	87	NP_079983.1	571	97.0	96.8
Orca	Artiodactyls	94	XP_004270054.1	571	99.1	96.2
Koala	Diprotodontia	160	XP_020842083.1	645	93.2	84.8
Common Garter Snake	Squamata	319	XP_013915426.1	571	87.7	95.4
Brown Anole	Squamata	319	XP_060644111.2	571	87.0	95.0
Papuan Ground Boa	Squamata	319	XP_063146665.1	571	87.6	92.3
American Alligator	Crocodilia	319	KYO47230.1	585	93.2	92.0
Kori Bustard	Otidiformes	319	NXE21565.1	577	92.5	95.6
Humboldt Penguin	Sphenisciformes	319	KAF1420631.1	577	92.2	95.2
Barn Owl	Strigiformes	319	XP_042655085.1	571	92.5	94.9
Chicken	Galliformes	319	XP_015132273.1	571	92.6	91.8
Gaboon Caecilian	Gymnophiona	352	XP_033809266.1	574	92.5	95.0
American Toad	Anura	352	XP_040267576.1	571	88.1	92.1
Coelacanth	Latimeriodei	415	XP_064420773.1	571	88.4	92.3
Zebrafish	Cypriniformes	429	XP_017207216.1	571	83.2	90.4
Small-toothed Sawfish	Rhinoprisitiformes	462	XP_051874951.1	571	85.1	89.7
Great White Shark	Lamniformes	462	XP_041069815.1	571	85.5	89.9
Sea Lamprey	Petromyzontiformes	563	XP_032831289.1	611	61.4	71.0
European Lancelet	Amphioxiformes	581	XP_066281657.1	574	56.6	70.3
Crown-of-thorns Starfish	Valvatida	619	XP_022083107.1	576	53.3	67.9
Branching Stony Coral	Scleractinia	685	XP_029214089.1	570	49.7	65.8
Chiton	Chitonida	686	XP_064600849.1	521	47.8	55.5

==== Paralogs ====
Selected Paralogs of KLHL28
Gene Name	Protein Accession #	Sequence length (aa)	Identity to KLHL28 (%)	Similarity to KLHL28 (%)
KLHL28	NP_001295041.1	585	100.0	100.0
KLHL5	NP_001007076.1	709	39.9	57.4
KLHL3	NP_059111.2	587	38.7	54.9
KLHL20	NP_055273.2	609	42.8	54.3
KLHL17	NP_938073.1	642	41.7	54.5
KLHL1	NP_066917.1	748	40.6	53.5

== Clinical significance ==
Based on the function of its encoded protein in protein breakdown and recycling, the KLHL28 gene has a strong clinical significance. Furthermore, the expression data in hypoxic and cancerous conditions suggests the Cullin3-RING E3 ubiquitin ligase complex is involved in protein homeostasis, which can be sabotaged in cancerous cells. Consequently, the KLHL28 gene and its interaction network represent novel targets for gene therapy cancer treatments.
