= NS10 =

NS10, NS 10, NS-10, NS.10, or, variation, may refer to:

== Places ==
- Admiralty MRT station (station code: NS10), Woodlands, Singapore
- Yamashita Station (Hyōgo), station code NS10; Kawanishi, Hyōgo Prefecture, Japan
- Shiku Station (station code: NS10), Ina, Saitama, Japan
- Colchester-Musquodoboit Valley (constituency N.S. 10), Nova Scotia, Canada
- Brokopondo District (FIPS region code NS10), Suriname

== Other uses ==
- Yamaha NS-10, loud speaker
- Blue Origin NS-10, a 2019 January 23 Blue Origin suborbital spaceflight mission for the New Shepard
- RAF N.S. 10, a British NS class airship
- LZTR1, a protein and gene also called "NS10"

== See also ==
- NS (disambiguation)
- 10 (disambiguation)
