= Kelch-like protein 41 =

Protein found in humans

KLHL41

Identifiers
- Aliases: KLHL41, KBTBD10, Krp1, NEM9, SARCOSIN, kelch like family member 41
- External IDs: OMIM: 607701; MGI: 2683854; GeneCards: KLHL41

Gene location (Human)
| Chr. | Chromosome 2 (human) |
| Band | 2q31.1 | Start | 169,509,702 bp |
| Band | 2q31.1 | End | 169,526,258 bp |

Gene location (Mouse)
| Chr. | Chromosome 2 (mouse) |
| Band | 2|2 C2 | Start | 69,500,464 bp |
| Band | 2|2 C2 | End | 69,514,574 bp |
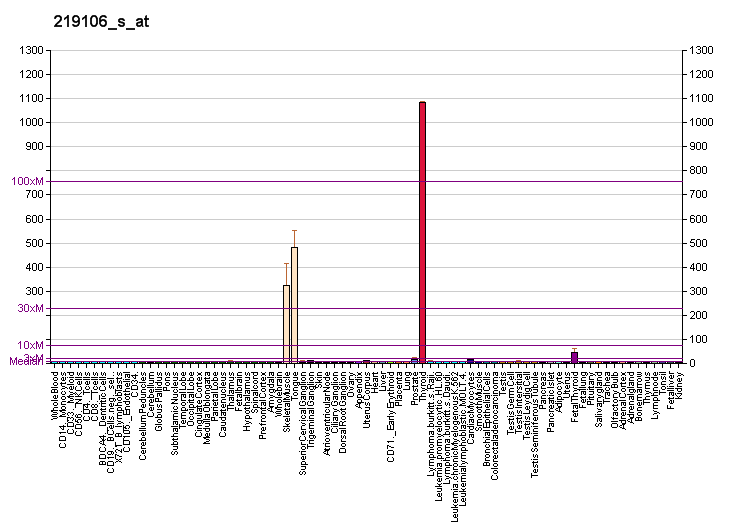
RNA expression pattern
| Bgee | Human / Mouse (ortholog); Top expressed in: tibialis anterior muscle; gastrocnemius muscle; muscle of thigh; biceps brachii; Skeletal muscle tissue of biceps brachii; Skeletal muscle tissue of rectus abdominis; quadriceps femoris muscle; body of tongue; vastus lateralis muscle; deltoid muscle / Top expressed in: knee joint; ankle; soleus muscle; muscle of thigh; medial head of gastrocnemius muscle; tibialis anterior muscle; skeletal muscle tissue; extraocular muscle; temporal muscle; sternocleidomastoid muscle; More reference expression data |
| BioGPS | More reference expression data |
Gene ontology
| Molecular function | ubiquitin-protein transferase activity; protein binding |
| Cellular component | cytoplasm; M band; cell projection; pseudopodium; endoplasmic reticulum membrane; membrane; ruffle; Cul3-RING ubiquitin ligase complex; plasma membrane; sarcoplasmic reticulum; endoplasmic reticulum; sarcoplasmic reticulum membrane; cytoskeleton; nucleus; cytosol |
| Biological process | regulation of skeletal muscle cell differentiation; myofibril assembly; regulation of myoblast differentiation; protein ubiquitination; skeletal muscle cell differentiation; striated muscle contraction; regulation of myoblast proliferation; sarcomere organization; skeletal muscle fiber development; post-translational protein modification |
Sources:Amigo / QuickGO
Orthologs
| Databases | NCBI: entry; OMA: entry |
| Species | Human | Mouse |
| Entrez | 10324 | 228003 |
| Ensembl | ENSG00000239474 | ENSMUSG00000075307 |
| UniProt | O60662 | A2AUC9 |
| RefSeq (mRNA) | NM_006063 | NM_001081087 |
| RefSeq (protein) | NP_006054 | NP_001074556 |
| Location (UCSC) | Chr 2: 169.51 – 169.53 Mb | Chr 2: 69.5 – 69.51 Mb |
| PubMed search |
- Wikidata
| View/Edit Human | View/Edit Mouse |

Kelch-like protein 41 is a protein that in humans is encoded by the KLHL41 gene (previously KBTBD10). This protein is part of the kelch-like family of proteins, and seems to be involved in muscle development and maintenance.
