= IVNS1ABP =

Protein-coding gene in humans

Identifiers
- Aliases: IVNS1ABP, FLARA3, HSPC068, KLHL39, ND1, NS-1, NS1-BP, NS1BP, influenza virus NS1A binding protein, ARA3, IMD70
- External IDs: OMIM: 609209; MGI: 2152389; GeneCards: IVNS1ABP

Gene location (Human)
Chr.	Chromosome 1 (human)
Band	1q25.3	Start	185,296,388 bp
Band	1q25.3	End	185,317,273 bp

Gene location (Mouse)
Chr.	Chromosome 1 (mouse)
Band	1|1 G1	Start	151,220,228 bp
Band	1|1 G1	End	151,240,173 bp
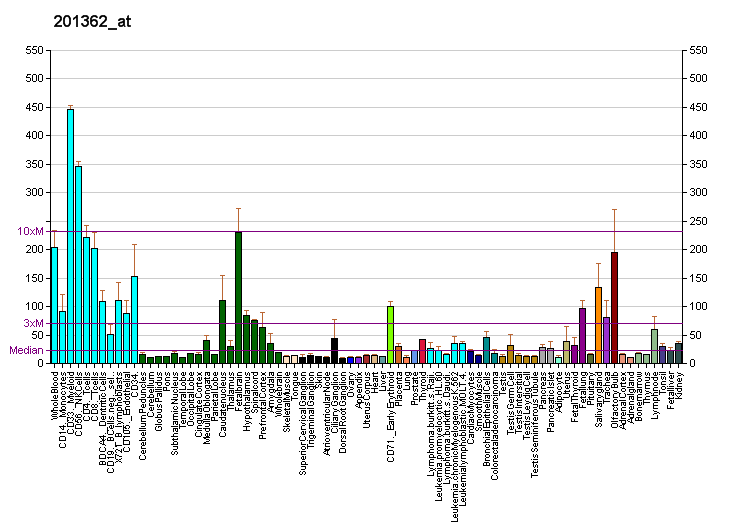

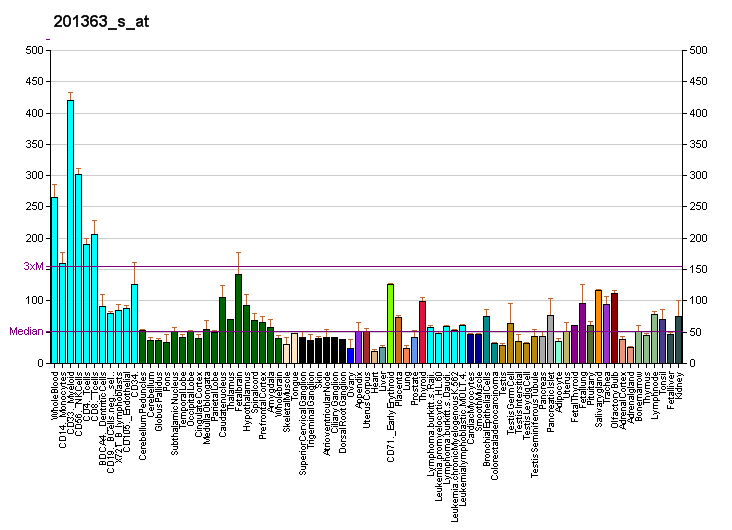

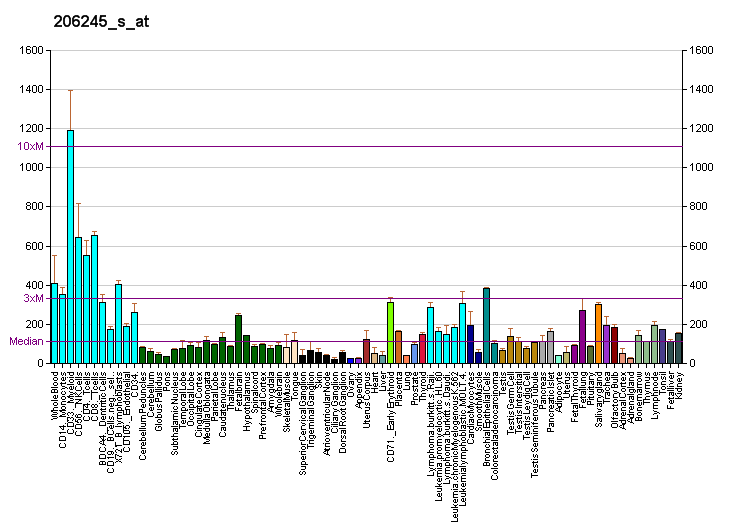
RNA expression pattern
Bgee	Human / Mouse (ortholog); Top expressed in: ganglionic eminence; tibia; minor salivary glands; ventricular zone; Achilles tendon; skin of abdomen; bone marrow; rectum; skin of leg; bone marrow cell / Top expressed in: epithelium of lens; Paneth cell; myocardium of ventricle; medullary collecting duct; efferent ductule; olfactory epithelium; cardiac muscle tissue of left ventricle; primitive streak; cumulus cell; aortic valve; More reference expression data
BioGPS	More reference expression data
Gene ontology
Molecular function	protein binding
Cellular component	actin cytoskeleton; spliceosomal complex; cytoskeleton; nucleus; transcription regulator complex; nucleoplasm; cytoplasm; cytosol
Biological process	negative regulation of intrinsic apoptotic signaling pathway; viral process; transcription by RNA polymerase III; RNA splicing; response to virus; negative regulation of protein ubiquitination
Sources:Amigo / QuickGO
Orthologs
Databases	NCBI: entry; OMA: entry
Species	Human	Mouse
Entrez	10625	117198
Ensembl	ENSG00000116679	ENSMUSG00000023150
UniProt	Q9Y6Y0	Q920Q8
RefSeq (mRNA)	NM_006469; NM_016389	NM_001039511; NM_001039512; NM_028582; NM_054102; NM_001359262 NM_001359263
RefSeq (protein)	NP_006460	NP_001034600; NP_001034601; NP_473443; NP_001346191; NP_001346192
Location (UCSC)	Chr 1: 185.3 – 185.32 Mb	Chr 1: 151.22 – 151.24 Mb
PubMed search
- Wikidata
View/Edit Human	View/Edit Mouse

Influenza virus NS1A-binding protein is a protein that in humans is encoded by the IVNS1ABP gene.

In melanocytic cells IVNS1ABP gene expression may be regulated by MITF.
