= LZTR1 =

Protein-coding gene in the species Homo sapiens

Identifiers
- Aliases: LZTR1, BTBD29, LZTR-1, SWNTS2, NS10, leucine-zipper-like transcription regulator 1, leucine zipper like transcription regulator 1, NS2
- External IDs: OMIM: 600574; MGI: 1914113; GeneCards: LZTR1

Gene location (Human)
Chr.	Chromosome 22 (human)
Band	22q11.21|22q11.1-q11.2	Start	20,982,269 bp
Band	22q11.21|22q11.1-q11.2	End	20,999,032 bp

Gene location (Mouse)
Chr.	Chromosome 16 (mouse)
Band	16|16 A3	Start	17,326,552 bp
Band	16|16 A3	End	17,344,197 bp
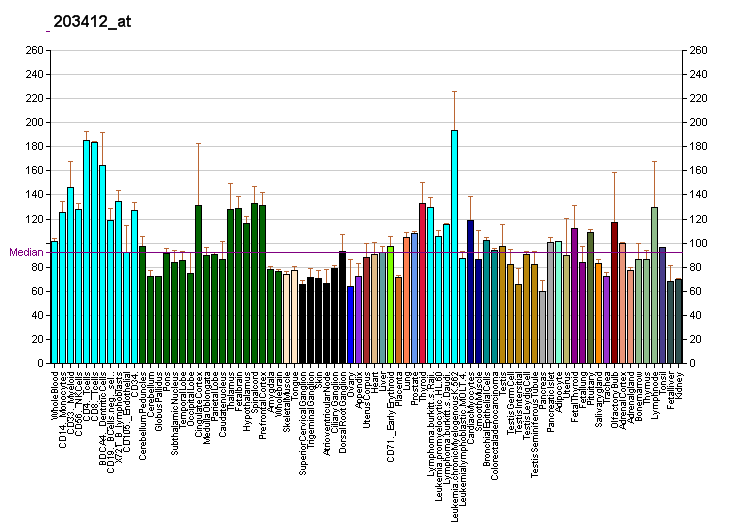
RNA expression pattern
Bgee	Human / Mouse (ortholog); Top expressed in: sural nerve; pituitary gland; anterior pituitary; right hemisphere of cerebellum; stromal cell of endometrium; granulocyte; body of uterus; right ovary; myometrium; left ovary / Top expressed in: external carotid artery; internal carotid artery; otic vesicle; dentate gyrus of hippocampal formation granule cell; subiculum; fossa; substantia nigra; trigeminal ganglion; condyle; primary motor cortex; More reference expression data
BioGPS	More reference expression data
Gene ontology
Molecular function	DNA-binding transcription factor activity
Cellular component	Golgi apparatus
Biological process	anatomical structure morphogenesis; regulation of transcription, DNA-templated
Sources:Amigo / QuickGO
Orthologs
Databases	NCBI: entry; OMA: entry
Species	Human	Mouse
Entrez	8216	66863
Ensembl	ENSG00000099949	ENSMUSG00000022761
UniProt	Q8N653	Q9CQ33
RefSeq (mRNA)	NM_006767	NM_025808; NM_001331226; NM_001331227
RefSeq (protein)	NP_006758	NP_001318155; NP_001318156; NP_080084
Location (UCSC)	Chr 22: 20.98 – 21 Mb	Chr 16: 17.33 – 17.34 Mb
PubMed search
- Wikidata
View/Edit Human	View/Edit Mouse

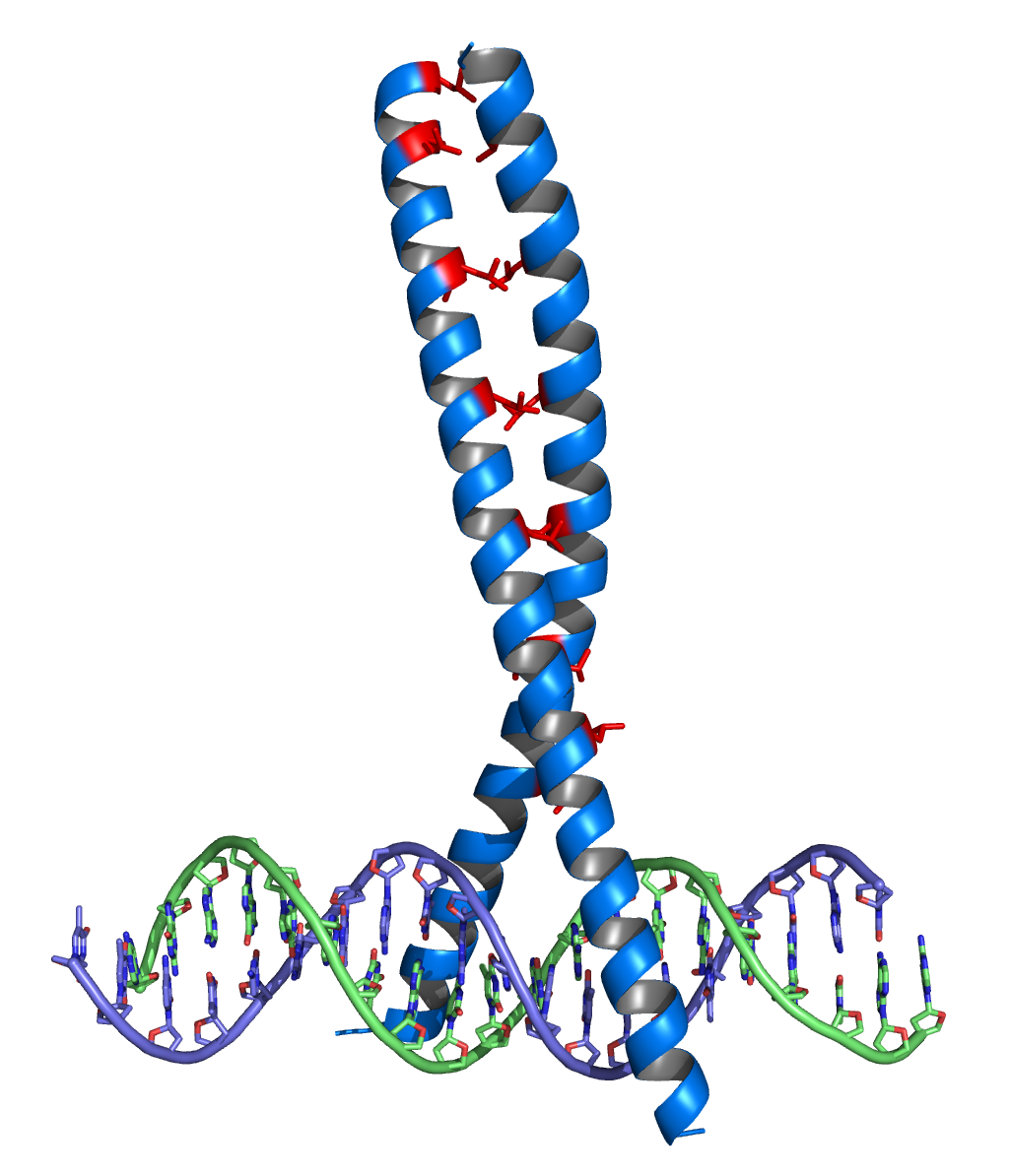
Leucine Zipper Transcription Regulator Protein Structure

Leucine-zipper-like transcriptional regulator 1 is a protein that in humans is encoded by the LZTR1 gene.

The LZTR1 gene provides instructions for making a protein among the class of the superfamily broad complex, tamtrack & brick-a-bac / poxvirus and zinc finger (BTB/POZ). The superfamily of proteins has a wide range of functions including chromatin condensation during conformation of the cell cycle. Other names associated with the LZTR gene are: BTBD29, LZTR-1, NS10, NS2, SWNTS2. This gene encodes a member of the BTB-kelch superfamily. Initially described as a putative transcriptional regulator based on weak homology to members of the basic leucine zipper-like family, the encoded protein subsequently has been shown to localize exclusively to the Golgi network where it may help stabilize the Golgi complex.

== Gene ==
The LZTR 1 gene is located on Chromosome 22: more specifically on the long arm at 22q11.21. The gene is approximately 16,768 base pairs long.

== Function ==
Based on its role in several tumor types, the LZTR1 protein is thought to act as a tumor suppressor. Tumor suppressors are proteins that keep cells from growing and dividing too rapidly or in an uncontrolled way. The LZTR1 is a non-specific protein that is found in all cells inside the body. It is believed to be a transcriptional regulator that is typically degraded on apoptotic cells. The protein will be phosphorylated at its tyrosine receptors that will target it for degradation. Intracellularly, LZTR proteins will be found in the Golgi apparatus. Studies suggest that the LZTR1 protein may help stabilize this structure. LTZR1 protein could possibly be associated with the CUL3 ubiquitin ligase (Cullin-Based Ubiquitin Ligase 3) complex that helps function to destroy unneeded proteins in the cell. It has also been observed that LZTR protein will inhibit Ras signaling in the membrane by reducing the affinity of Ras to the membrane. Ras belongs to the family of GTPases that are involved in transcription regulation and activation of Raf enzymes. Raf molecules will cascade phosphorylate other molecules in the body to have a wide impact on a cell. Studies using immunoprecipitation of endogenous LZTR1 followed by Western blotting were used to find the function of the LZTR gene. By trapping LZTR1 complexes from intact mammalian cells, Steklov et al. (2018) identified the guanosine triphosphatase RAS as a substrate for the LZTR1-CUL3 complex.

== Clinical significance ==
=== Glioblastoma ===
Studies have found that mutations in the LZTR1 gene were found in malignant cancerous cells in the tumors of patients with glioblastoma. These mutations were found to be somatic, typically caused by environmental factors, and the loss of the LZTR1 gene are seen in the cells that are divided uncontrollably.

=== DiGeorge syndrome ===
DiGeorge syndrome (known as 22q11.2 deletion) caused by a deletion in the 22nd chromosome. Some of the typical symptoms associated with DiGeorge Syndrome are specific facial structure, congenital heart disease, and developmental delays. The implications of LZTR1 mutations were first diagnosed in DiGeorge patients. Studies have shown that deletion or mutation of the LZTR1 are identified in most patients that have been diagnosed with DiGeorge syndrome. The transcriptional regulation capabilities of the LZTR1 gene may play an important role in embryogenesis and is observed in several fetal organs.

=== Noonan syndrome ===
Noonan syndrome is an autosomal dominant multisystem disorder characterized by a wide phenotypic spectrum including distinctive facial dysmorphism, postnatal growth retardation, short stature, ectodermal and skeletal defects, congenital heart anomalies, renal anomalies, lymphatic malformations, bleeding difficulties and variable cognitive deficits.

Studies have shown that in 29 genes there were 163 variants in patients with Noonan Syndrome. In the study, using In Silco software, the heterozygous missense mutation of the LZTR1 gene at exon 4 was the most pathogenic. This missense mutation will lead to a substitution of an alanine to valine in the primary structure of amino acid for the LZTR protein.

=== Schwannomatosis ===
In patients with schwannomatosis, more than fifty different mutations in the LZTR1 gene are observed. These mutations themselves are not sufficient to cause the disorder, but are typically associated with it. The somatic changes from environmental factors are also seen in patients with schwannomatosis. When the gene is altered, the LTZR protein cannot function properly to regulate the cell cycle by controlling the growth division. This unregulated growth will lead to non-cancerous (benign) tumors along the peripheral nerves. These tumors are known as Schwannomas.
