= ELAV-like protein 2 =

Protein-coding gene in the species Homo sapiens

ELAVL2
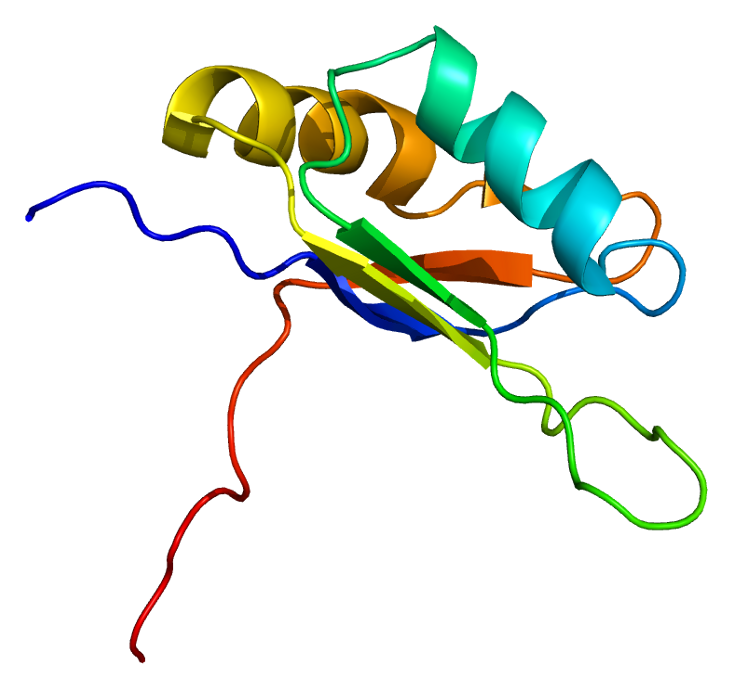

Identifiers
- Aliases: ELAVL2, HEL-N1, HELN1, HUB, ELAV like neuron-specific RNA binding protein 2, ELAV like RNA binding protein 2
- External IDs: OMIM: 601673; MGI: 1100887; GeneCards: ELAVL2

Gene location (Mouse)
Chr.	Chromosome 4 (mouse)
Band	4 C5|4 42.36 cM	Start	91,250,763 bp
Band	4 C5|4 42.36 cM	End	91,400,785 bp
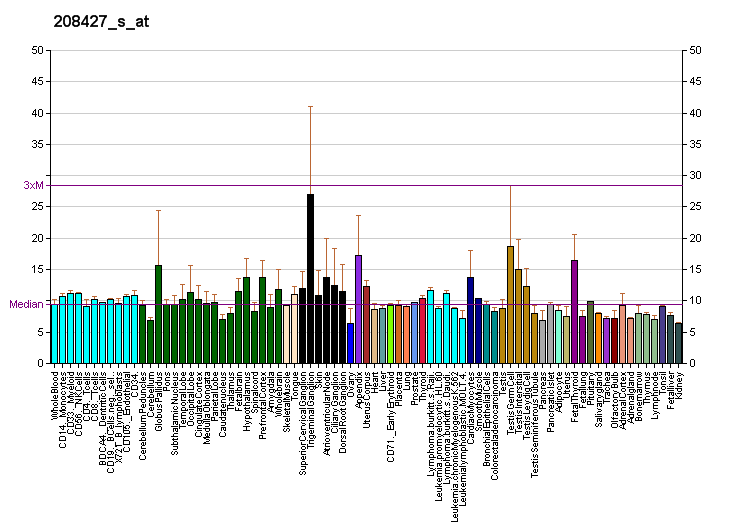
RNA expression pattern
Bgee	Human / Mouse (ortholog); n/a / Top expressed in: superior cervical ganglion; facial motor nucleus; Rostral migratory stream; mammillary body; medial ganglionic eminence; medial dorsal nucleus; medial vestibular nucleus; lateral hypothalamus; pontine nuclei; dorsomedial hypothalamic nucleus
BioGPS	More reference expression data
Gene ontology
Molecular function	protein binding; mRNA 3'-UTR binding; nucleic acid binding; RNA binding
Cellular component	nucleoplasm
Biological process	regulation of transcription, DNA-templated; mRNA splicing, via spliceosome
Sources:Amigo / QuickGO
Orthologs
Databases	NCBI: entry; OMA: entry
Species	Human	Mouse
Entrez	1993	15569
Ensembl	ENSG00000107105	ENSMUSG00000008489
UniProt	Q12926	Q60899
RefSeq (mRNA)	NM_001171195; NM_001171197; NM_004432	NM_001177883; NM_010486; NM_207685; NM_207686; NM_001347149 NM_001357188; NM_001357189
RefSeq (protein)	NP_001164666; NP_001164668; NP_004423; NP_001338384; NP_001338385 NP_001338386; NP_001338387; NP_001338388; NP_001338389; NP_001338390; NP_001338391; NP_001338392; NP_001338393; NP_001338394; NP_001338395; NP_001338396; NP_001338397; NP_001338398; NP_001338399; NP_001338400; NP_001338401; NP_001338402; NP_001338403; NP_001338404; NP_001338405; NP_001338406; NP_001338407	NP_001171354; NP_001334078; NP_034616; NP_997568; NP_997569 NP_001344117; NP_001344118; NP_001361165; NP_001361166; NP_001361167; NP_001361625
Location (UCSC)	n/a	Chr 4: 91.25 – 91.4 Mb
PubMed search
- Wikidata
View/Edit Human	View/Edit Mouse

ELAV-like protein 2 is a protein that in humans is encoded by the ELAVL2 gene.
