= PUM1 =

Protein-coding gene in humans

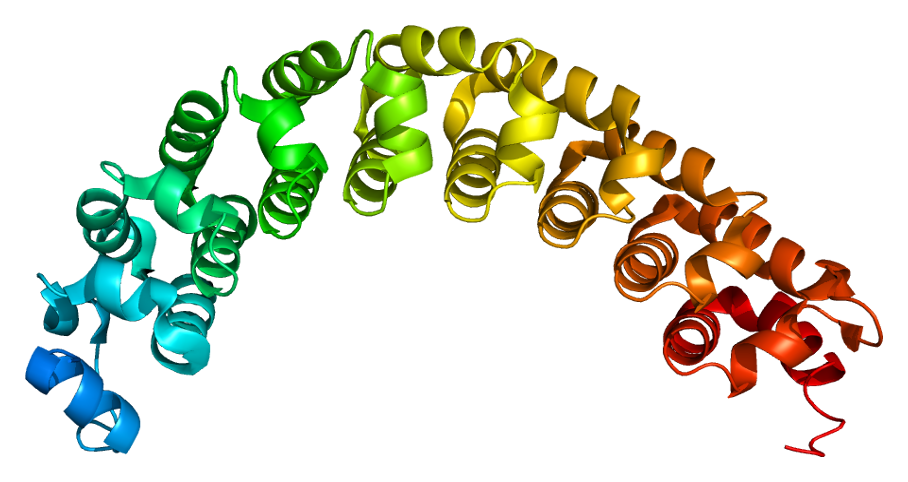

Identifiers
- Aliases: PUM1, HSPUM, PUMH, PUMH1, PUML1, pumilio RNA binding family member 1, SCA47
- External IDs: OMIM: 607204; MGI: 1931749; GeneCards: PUM1
Available structures
PDB	Ortholog search: PDBe RCSB
PDB	List of PDB id codes 1IB2, 1M8W, 1M8X, 1M8Y, 1M8Z, 2YJY, 3BSB, 3BSX, 3Q0L, 3Q0M, 3Q0N, 3Q0O, 3Q0P

Gene location (Human)
Chr.	Chromosome 1 (human)
Band	1p35.2	Start	30,931,506 bp
Band	1p35.2	End	31,065,991 bp
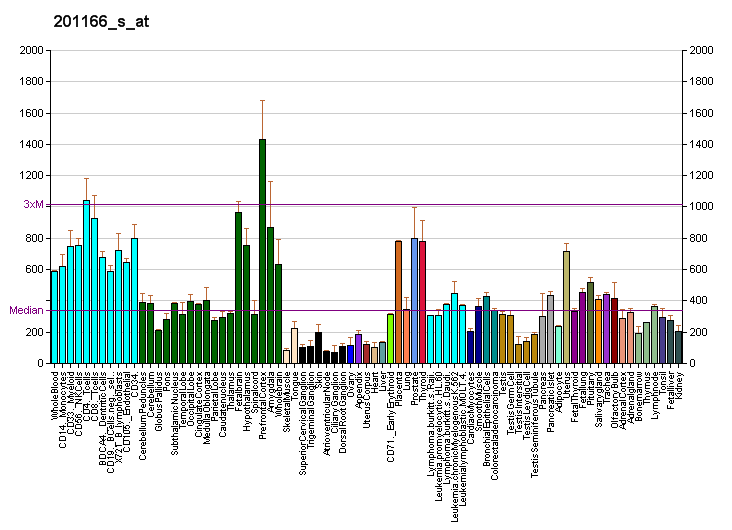

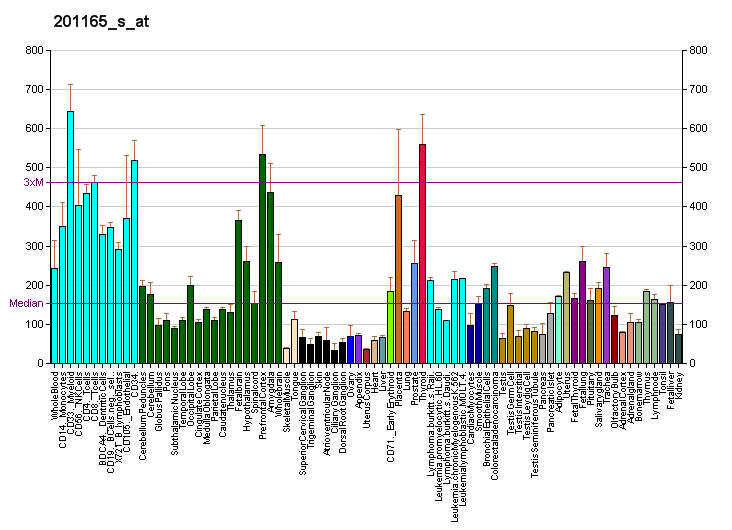

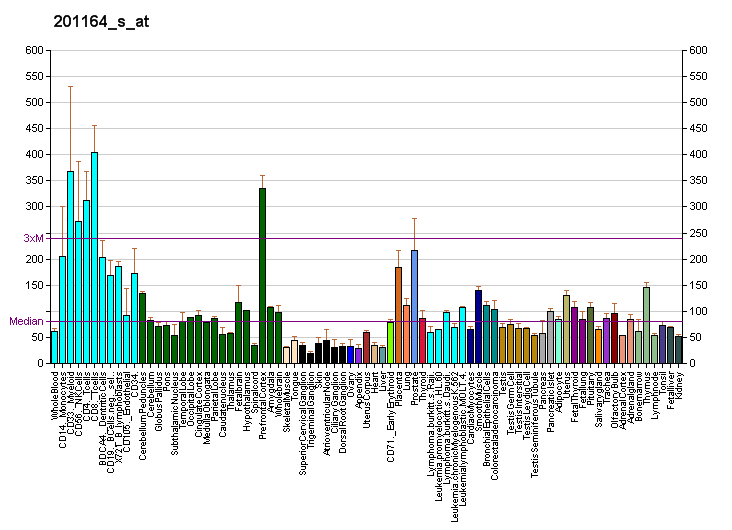
RNA expression pattern
Bgee	Human / Mouse (ortholog); Top expressed in: dorsal motor nucleus of vagus nerve; Region I of hippocampus proper; germinal epithelium; superficial temporal artery; visceral pleura; tibia; inferior olivary nucleus; gingival epithelium; hair follicle; parietal pleura / n/a; More reference expression data
BioGPS	More reference expression data
Gene ontology
Molecular function	mRNA 3'-UTR binding; protein binding; RNA binding; miRNA binding
Cellular component	cytoplasm; P-body; cytoplasmic stress granule; nucleus; nucleoplasm; cytosol; nuclear speck
Biological process	regulation of gene silencing by miRNA; cell differentiation; regulation of mRNA stability; adult locomotory behavior; positive regulation of gene silencing by miRNA; stem cell differentiation; regulation of cell cycle; posttranscriptional gene silencing; regulation of chromosome segregation; positive regulation of RIG-I signaling pathway; mRNA destabilization; spermatogenesis; regulation of translation; posttranscriptional regulation of gene expression; production of miRNAs involved in gene silencing by miRNA
Sources:Amigo / QuickGO
Orthologs
Databases	NCBI: entry; OMA: entry
Species	Human	Mouse
Entrez	9698	80912
Ensembl	ENSG00000134644	ENSMUSG00000028580
UniProt	Q14671	Q80U78
RefSeq (mRNA)	NM_014676; NM_001020658	NM_001159603; NM_001159604; NM_001159605; NM_001159606; NM_030722
RefSeq (protein)	NP_001018494; NP_055491	NP_001153075; NP_001153076; NP_001153077; NP_001153078; NP_109647 NP_001343493; NP_001343494; NP_001343495
Location (UCSC)	Chr 1: 30.93 – 31.07 Mb	n/a
PubMed search
- Wikidata
View/Edit Human	View/Edit Mouse

Pumilio homolog 1 is a protein that in humans is encoded by the PUM1 gene.

== Function ==
This gene encodes a member of the PUF family, evolutionarily conserved RNA-binding proteins related to the Pumilio proteins of Drosophila and the fem-3 mRNA binding factor proteins of C. elegans. The encoded protein contains a sequence-specific RNA binding domain composed of eight repeats and N- and C-terminal flanking regions, and serves as a translational regulator of specific mRNAs by binding to their 3' untranslated regions. The evolutionarily conserved function of the encoded protein in invertebrates and lower vertebrates suggests that the human protein may be involved in translational regulation of embryogenesis, and cell development and differentiation. Alternatively spliced transcript variants encoding different isoforms have been described.
