= Zinc finger protein 530 =

Protein found in humans

ZNF530

Identifiers
- Aliases: ZNF530, zinc finger protein 530
- External IDs: GeneCards: ZNF530

Gene location (Human)
Chr.	Chromosome 19 (human)
Band	19q13.43	Start	57,599,885 bp
Band	19q13.43	End	57,612,722 bp
RNA expression pattern
Bgee	Human / Mouse (ortholog); Top expressed in: secondary oocyte; gonad; buccal mucosa cell; apex of heart; cerebellar hemisphere; ventricular zone; gastrocnemius muscle; right hemisphere of cerebellum; granulocyte; ganglionic eminence / n/a; More reference expression data
BioGPS	n/a
Gene ontology
Molecular function	DNA binding; metal ion binding; nucleic acid binding; DNA-binding transcription factor activity, RNA polymerase II-specific
Cellular component	intracellular anatomical structure; nucleus
Biological process	regulation of transcription, DNA-templated; transcription, DNA-templated; regulation of transcription by RNA polymerase II
Sources:Amigo / QuickGO
Orthologs
Databases	NCBI: entry; OMA: entry
Species	Human	Mouse
Entrez	348327	n/a
Ensembl	ENSG00000183647	n/a
UniProt	Q6P9A1	n/a
RefSeq (mRNA)	NM_020880; NM_001321981; NM_001387561; NM_001387562; NM_001387563	n/a
RefSeq (protein)	NP_001308910; NP_065931	n/a
Location (UCSC)	Chr 19: 57.6 – 57.61 Mb	n/a
PubMed search		n/a
- Wikidata
View/Edit Human

Zinc finger protein 530 is a protein that in humans is encoded by the ZNF530 gene.
