= KBTBD7 =

Protein-coding gene in the species Homo sapiens

Identifiers
- Aliases: KBTBD7, kelch repeat and BTB domain containing 7
- External IDs: OMIM: 617739; MGI: 2685141; GeneCards: KBTBD7

Gene location (Human)
| Chr. | Chromosome 13 (human) |
| Band | 13q14.11 | Start | 41,189,834 bp |
| Band | 13q14.11 | End | 41,194,569 bp |

Gene location (Mouse)
| Chr. | Chromosome 14 (mouse) |
| Band | 14|14 D3 | Start | 79,663,951 bp |
| Band | 14|14 D3 | End | 79,668,476 bp |
RNA expression pattern
| Bgee | Human / Mouse (ortholog); Top expressed in: secondary oocyte; buccal mucosa cell; endothelial cell; retinal pigment epithelium; tibia; palpebral conjunctiva; trabecular bone; gonad; amniotic fluid; ganglionic eminence / Top expressed in: primary oocyte; secondary oocyte; zygote; otolith organ; utricle; retinal pigment epithelium; medial ganglionic eminence; lateral septal nucleus; subiculum; Region I of hippocampus proper; More reference expression data |
| BioGPS | n/a |
Gene ontology
| Molecular function | protein binding; ubiquitin-protein transferase activity; molecular function |
| Cellular component | cytosol; Cul3-RING ubiquitin ligase complex; cellular component |
| Biological process | MAPK cascade; protein ubiquitination; post-translational protein modification; biological process |
Sources:Amigo / QuickGO
Orthologs
| Databases | NCBI: entry; OMA: entry |
| Species | Human | Mouse |
| Entrez | 84078 | 211255 |
| Ensembl | ENSG00000120696 | ENSMUSG00000043881 |
| UniProt | Q8WVZ9 | n/a |
| RefSeq (mRNA) | NM_032138 | NM_001024135 |
| RefSeq (protein) | NP_115514 | n/a |
| Location (UCSC) | Chr 13: 41.19 – 41.19 Mb | Chr 14: 79.66 – 79.67 Mb |
| PubMed search |
- Wikidata
| View/Edit Human | View/Edit Mouse |

Kelch repeat and BTB domain-containing protein 7 is a protein that in humans is encoded by the KBTBD7 gene.
