= KLHDC3 =

Protein-coding gene in the species Homo sapiens

Identifiers
- Aliases: KLHDC3, PEAS, dJ20C7.3, kelch domain containing 3
- External IDs: OMIM: 611248; MGI: 2651568; HomoloGene: 14290; GeneCards: KLHDC3; OMA:KLHDC3 - orthologs

Gene location (Human)
Chr.	Chromosome 6 (human)
Band	6p21.1	Start	43,014,103 bp
Band	6p21.1	End	43,021,298 bp

Gene location (Mouse)
Chr.	Chromosome 17 (mouse)
Band	17 22.9 cM|17 C	Start	46,985,476 bp
Band	17 22.9 cM|17 C	End	46,991,840 bp
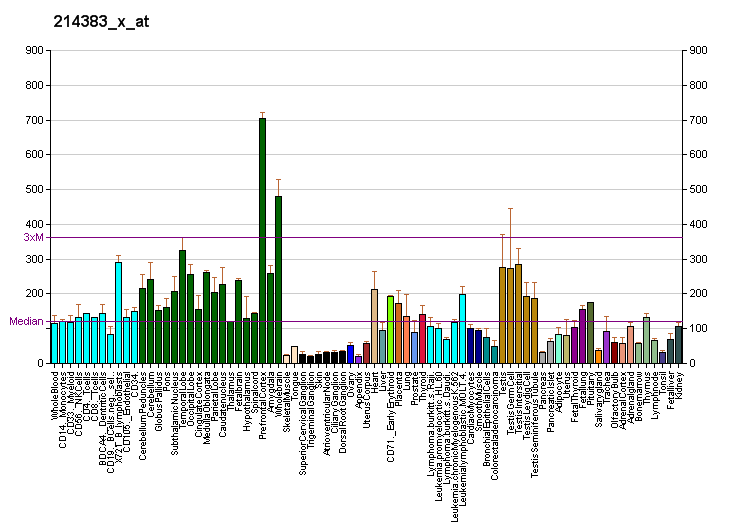

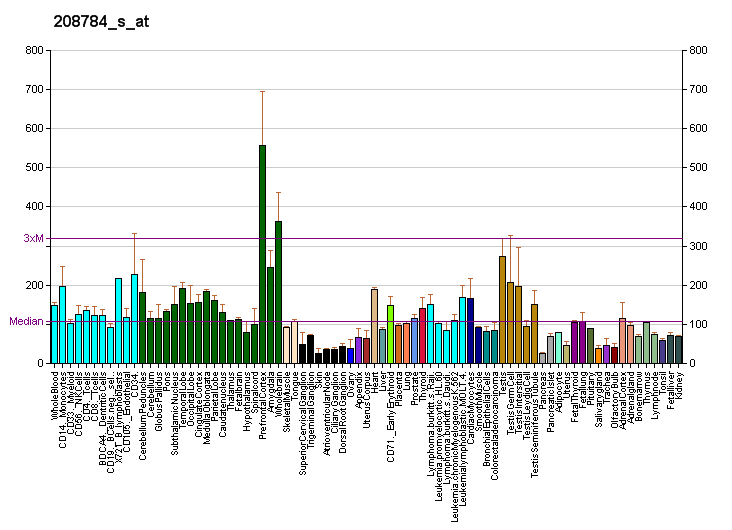
RNA expression pattern
Bgee	Human / Mouse (ortholog); Top expressed in: right testis; left testis; right frontal lobe; prefrontal cortex; cerebellar hemisphere; right hemisphere of cerebellum; muscle of thigh; Brodmann area 9; triceps brachii muscle; nucleus accumbens / Top expressed in: seminiferous tubule; primary visual cortex; superior frontal gyrus; dentate gyrus of hippocampal formation granule cell; right ventricle; muscle of thigh; yolk sac; temporal muscle; ankle; secondary oocyte; More reference expression data
BioGPS	More reference expression data
Gene ontology
Molecular function	chromatin binding; protein binding
Cellular component	cytoplasm; cytosol; nucleoplasm
Biological process	reciprocal meiotic recombination; IRE1-mediated unfolded protein response; meiosis
Sources:Amigo / QuickGO
Orthologs
Species	Human	Mouse
Entrez	116138	71765
Ensembl	ENSG00000124702	ENSMUSG00000063576
UniProt	Q9BQ90	Q8VEM9
RefSeq (mRNA)	NM_001242872; NM_057161	NM_001163729; NM_027910
RefSeq (protein)	NP_476502	NP_001157201; NP_082186
Location (UCSC)	Chr 6: 43.01 – 43.02 Mb	Chr 17: 46.99 – 46.99 Mb
PubMed search
- Wikidata
View/Edit Human	View/Edit Mouse

Kelch domain-containing protein 3 is a protein that in humans is encoded by the KLHDC3 gene.

The protein encoded by this gene contains six repeated kelch motifs that are structurally similar to recombination activating gene 2 (RAG2), a protein involved in the activation of the V(D)J recombination. This gene is found to express specifically in testis. Its expression in pachytene spermatocytes is localized to cytoplasm and meiotic chromatin, which suggests that this gene may be involved in meiotic recombination.
