= Kelch-like protein 8 =

Protein-coding gene in the species Homo sapiens

KLHL8

Identifiers
- Aliases: KLHL8, kelch like family member 8
- External IDs: OMIM: 611967; MGI: 2179430; GeneCards: KLHL8

Gene location (Human)
Chr.	Chromosome 4 (human)
Band	4q22.1	Start	87,160,103 bp
Band	4q22.1	End	87,240,314 bp

Gene location (Mouse)
Chr.	Chromosome 5 (mouse)
Band	5 E5|5 50.45 cM	Start	104,009,839 bp
Band	5 E5|5 50.45 cM	End	104,059,125 bp
RNA expression pattern
Bgee	Human / Mouse (ortholog); Top expressed in: corpus epididymis; secondary oocyte; tail of epididymis; deltoid muscle; caput epididymis; Skeletal muscle tissue of biceps brachii; tibialis anterior muscle; trabecular bone; Skeletal muscle tissue of rectus abdominis; mucosa of ileum / Top expressed in: primary oocyte; zygote; secondary oocyte; triceps brachii muscle; knee joint; vastus lateralis muscle; temporal muscle; spermatocyte; sternocleidomastoid muscle; spermatid; More reference expression data
BioGPS	n/a
Gene ontology
Molecular function	ubiquitin-protein transferase activity
Cellular component	Cul3-RING ubiquitin ligase complex; nucleoplasm
Biological process	protein ubiquitination; ubiquitin-dependent protein catabolic process
Sources:Amigo / QuickGO
Orthologs
Databases	NCBI: entry; OMA: entry
Species	Human	Mouse
Entrez	57563	246293
Ensembl	ENSG00000145332	ENSMUSG00000029312
UniProt	Q9P2G9	P59280
RefSeq (mRNA)	NM_001292003; NM_001292006; NM_001292007; NM_020803	NM_178741; NM_001359986; NM_001359987
RefSeq (protein)	NP_001278932; NP_001278935; NP_001278936; NP_065854	NP_848856; NP_001346915; NP_001346916
Location (UCSC)	Chr 4: 87.16 – 87.24 Mb	Chr 5: 104.01 – 104.06 Mb
PubMed search
- Wikidata
View/Edit Human	View/Edit Mouse

Kelch-like protein 8 is a protein that in humans is encoded by the KLHL8 gene.
