= Kelch-like protein 18 =

Protein-coding gene in the species Homo sapiens

KLHL18

Identifiers
- Aliases: KLHL18, kelch like family member 18
- External IDs: MGI: 2143315; GeneCards: KLHL18

Gene location (Human)
Chr.	Chromosome 3 (human)
Band	3p21.31	Start	47,282,917 bp
Band	3p21.31	End	47,346,816 bp

Gene location (Mouse)
Chr.	Chromosome 9 (mouse)
Band	9|9 F2	Start	110,254,994 bp
Band	9|9 F2	End	110,305,762 bp
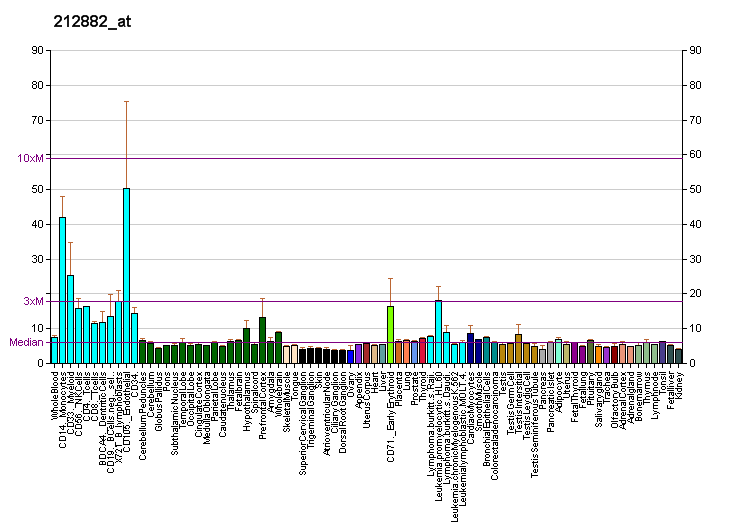
RNA expression pattern
Bgee	Human / Mouse (ortholog); Top expressed in: secondary oocyte; apex of heart; gastrocnemius muscle; muscle of thigh; monocyte; left ventricle; right auricle of heart; gonad; skin of leg; skin of abdomen / Top expressed in: neural layer of retina; granulocyte; secondary oocyte; internal carotid artery; primary oocyte; external carotid artery; lip; esophagus; autopod region; mesenteric lymph nodes; More reference expression data
BioGPS	More reference expression data
Gene ontology
Molecular function	ubiquitin-protein transferase activity; protein binding
Cellular component	Cul3-RING ubiquitin ligase complex
Biological process	protein ubiquitination
Sources:Amigo / QuickGO
Orthologs
Databases	NCBI: entry; OMA: entry
Species	Human	Mouse
Entrez	23276	270201
Ensembl	ENSG00000114648	ENSMUSG00000054792
UniProt	O94889	E9Q4F2
RefSeq (mRNA)	NM_025010	NM_177771; NM_001360306
RefSeq (protein)	NP_079286	NP_001347235; NP_808439
Location (UCSC)	Chr 3: 47.28 – 47.35 Mb	Chr 9: 110.25 – 110.31 Mb
PubMed search
- Wikidata
View/Edit Human	View/Edit Mouse

Kelch-like protein 18 is a protein that in humans is encoded by the KLHL18 gene.
