= Kelch-like protein 1 =

Protein-coding gene in the species Homo sapiens

KLHL1

Identifiers
- Aliases: KLHL1, MRP2, kelch like family member 1
- External IDs: OMIM: 605332; MGI: 2136335; GeneCards: KLHL1

Gene location (Human)
Chr.	Chromosome 13 (human)
Band	13q21.33	Start	69,700,594 bp
Band	13q21.33	End	70,108,493 bp

Gene location (Mouse)
Chr.	Chromosome 14 (mouse)
Band	14|14 E2.1	Start	96,340,172 bp
Band	14|14 E2.1	End	96,756,538 bp
RNA expression pattern
Bgee	Human / Mouse (ortholog); Top expressed in: pars reticulata; pars compacta; testicle; superior vestibular nucleus; ventral tegmental area; pons; hypothalamus; islet of Langerhans; ganglionic eminence; prefrontal cortex / Top expressed in: ventral tegmental area; substantia nigra; lumbar subsegment of spinal cord; lateral hypothalamus; habenula; ventromedial nucleus; mammillary body; supraoptic nucleus; central gray substance of midbrain; medial vestibular nucleus; More reference expression data
BioGPS	n/a
Gene ontology
Molecular function	ubiquitin-protein transferase activity; actin binding
Cellular component	Cul3-RING ubiquitin ligase complex; cytoskeleton; dendrite; soma; cytoplasm
Biological process	cerebellar Purkinje cell layer development; actin cytoskeleton organization; locomotory behavior; adult walking behavior; dendrite development; protein ubiquitination
Sources:Amigo / QuickGO
Orthologs
Databases	NCBI: entry; OMA: entry
Species	Human	Mouse
Entrez	57626	93688
Ensembl	ENSG00000150361	ENSMUSG00000022076
UniProt	Q9NR64	Q9JI74
RefSeq (mRNA)	NM_020866; NM_001286725	NM_053105
RefSeq (protein)	NP_001273654; NP_065917	NP_444335
Location (UCSC)	Chr 13: 69.7 – 70.11 Mb	Chr 14: 96.34 – 96.76 Mb
PubMed search
- Wikidata
View/Edit Human	View/Edit Mouse

Kelch-like protein 1 is a protein that in humans is encoded by the KLHL1 gene.
