= BTB/POZ domain =

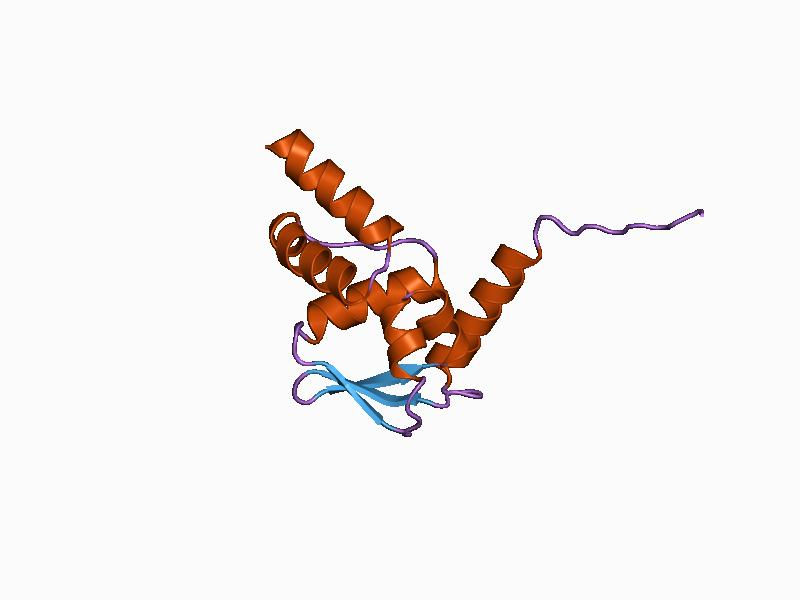
- Structure of the BTB domain from PLZF.

Identifiers
- Symbol: BTB
- Pfam: PF00651
- InterPro: IPR013069
- PROSITE: PS50097
- SCOP2: 1buo / SCOPe / SUPFAM
Available protein structures:
- PDB: 1buo , 1cs3 , 1r28 , 1r29 , 1r2b , 2nn2 , 3bim IPR013069 PF00651 (ECOD; PDBsum)
- AlphaFold: IPR013069; PF00651

The BTB/POZ domain (BTB for BR-C, ttk and bab or POZ for Pox virus and Zinc finger) is a structural domain found in proteins across the domain Eukarya. Given its prevalence in eukaryotes and its absence in Archaea and bacteria, it likely arose after the origin of eukaryotes. While primarily a protein-protein interaction domain, some BTB domains have additional functionality in transcriptional regulation, cytoskeletal mobility, protein ubiquitination and degradation, and ion channel formation and operation. BTB domains have traditionally been classified by the other structural features present in the protein.

== Discovery ==
The BTB/POZ domain was first described by two independent research groups in 1994. Researchers at UCLA found a conserved 115 amino acid motif in nine Drosophila proteins, including Broad complex, tramtrack, and bric-a-brac, and labelled the conserved region the BTB domain. At the same time, a group at Imperial Cancer Research Fund Laboratories in London discovered the same 120 amino acid motif in a set of otherwise unrelated zinc finger proteins and a set of pox-virus proteins, and thus named the region the POZ domain.

== Structure ==
The motif is approximately 120 amino acids long, with a core fold of 95 amino acids that form five alpha helices and three beta sheets. The alpha helices form two hairpin structures, A1/A2 and A4/A5, out of the first and second and the fourth and fifth alpha helices respectively. The remaining alpha helix, A3, bridges the two. The three beta sheets cap the A1/A2 hairpin. Additional secondary structures can surround this core fold. For example, BTB domains in Kelch proteins, C2H2 zinc finger proteins, and HTH-containing proteins frequently include an additional alpha helix and beta sheet at the N-terminus of the domain.

== Function ==
The BTB domain is primarily a protein-protein interaction domain. In zinc-finger proteins, it commonly forms homodimers with other BTB domains, mediates heteromeric dimerization, and recruits transcriptional corepressors.
